= Eleven-dimensional supergravity =

Supergravity in eleven dimensions

In supersymmetry, eleven-dimensional supergravity is the theory of supergravity in the highest number of dimensions allowed for a supersymmetric theory. It contains a graviton, a gravitino, and a 3-form gauge field, with their interactions uniquely fixed by supersymmetry. Discovered in 1978 by Eugène Cremmer, Bernard Julia, and Joël Scherk, it quickly became a popular candidate for a theory of everything during the 1980s. However, interest in it soon faded due to numerous difficulties that arise when trying to construct physically realistic models. It came back to prominence in the mid-1990s when it was found to be the low energy limit of M-theory, making it crucial for understanding various aspects of string theory.

== History ==
Supergravity was discovered in 1976 through the construction of pure four-dimensional supergravity with one gravitino. One important direction in the supergravity program was to try to construct four-dimensional $\mathcal N = 8$ supergravity since this was an attractive candidate for a theory of everything, stemming from the fact that it unifies particles of all physically admissible spins into a single multiplet. The theory may additionally be UV finite. Werner Nahm showed in 1978 that supersymmetry with spin less than or equal to two is only possible in eleven dimensions or lower. Motivated by this, eleven-dimensional supergravity was constructed by Eugène Cremmer, Bernard Julia, and Joël Scherk later the same year, with the aim of dimensionally reducing it to four dimensions to acquire the $\mathcal N = 8$ theory, which was done in 1979.

During the 1980s, 11D supergravity was of great interest in its own right as a possible fundamental theory of nature. This began in 1980 when Peter Freund and Mark Ruben showed that supergravity compactifies preferentially to four or seven dimensions when using a background where the field strength tensor is turned on. Additionally, Edward Witten argued in 1981 that eleven dimensions are also the minimum number of dimensions needed to acquire the Standard Model gauge group, assuming that this arises as subgroup of the isometry group of the compact manifold. (Note: The two arguments that eleven dimensions is the minimum number of dimensions needed to get the Standard Model gauge group, as well as the maximum number of dimensions in which supergravity works, had great theoretical appeal for the theory at the time.)

The main area of study was understanding how 11D supergravity compactifies down to four dimensions. While there are many ways to do this, depending on the choice of the compact manifold, the most popular one was using the 7-sphere. However, a number of problems were quickly identified with these approaches which eventually caused the program to be abandoned. One of the main issues was that many of the well-motivated manifolds could not yield the Standard Model gauge group. (Note: For example, the 7-sphere gives an $\text{SO}(8)$ gauge group which does not have $\text{SU}(3)\times \text{SU}(2)\times \text{U}(1)$ as a subgroup. Other 7-dimensional manifolds, such as $CP^2\times S^2\times S^1$, succeed in this regard but come with other downsides such as breaking all supersymmetry.) Another problem at the time was that standard Kaluza–Klein compactification made it hard to acquire chiral fermions needed to build the Standard Model. Additionally, these compactifications generally yielded very large negative cosmological constants which could be hard to remove. (Note: Any purely bosonic compactification will have a large cosmological constant, although one way to deal with this is to try to use fermionic condensates.) Lastly, quantizing the theory gave rise to quantum anomalies which were difficult to eliminate. Some of these problems can be overcome with more modern methods which were unknown at the time. For example, chiral fermions can be acquired by using singular manifolds, using noncompact manifolds, utilising the end-of-world 9-brane of the theory, or by exploiting string dualities that relate the 11D theory to chiral string theories. Similarly, the presence of branes can also be used to build larger gauge groups.

Due to these issues, 11D supergravity was abandoned in the late 1980s, although it remained an intriguing theory. Indeed, in 1988 Michael Green, John Schwartz, and Edward Witten wrote of it that

It is hard to believe that its existence is just an accident, but it is difficult at the present time to state a compelling conjecture for what its role may be in the scheme of things.

In 1995, Edward Witten discovered M-theory, whose low-energy limit is 11D supergravity, bringing the theory back into the forefront of physics and giving it an important place in string theory.

== Theory ==
In supersymmetry, the maximum number of real supercharges that give supermultiplets containing particles of spin less than or equal to two, is 32. Supercharges with more components result in supermultiplets that necessarily include higher spin states, making such theories unphysical. Since supercharges are spinors, supersymmetry can only be realized in dimensions that admit spinoral representations with no more than 32 components, which only occurs in eleven or fewer dimensions. (Note: The only exception is when considering arbitrary signatures, in which case twelve dimensions with a spacetime signature of (10,2) has spinors with 32 components and so admits a theory of supergravity.)

Eleven-dimensional supergravity is uniquely fixed by supersymmetry, with its structure being relatively simple compared to supergravity theories in other dimensions. The only free parameter is the Planck mass, setting the scale of the theory. It has a single multiplet consisting of the graviton, a Majorana gravitino, and a 3-form gauge field. The necessity of the 3-form field is seen by noting that it provides the missing 84 bosonic degrees of freedom needed to complete the multiplet since the graviton has 44 degrees of freedom while the gravitino has 128.

=== Superalgebra ===
The maximally-extended algebra for supersymmetry in eleven dimensions is given by

$$\{Q_\alpha,Q_\beta\} = (C\gamma)^\mu_{\alpha \beta}P_\mu + (C\gamma)^{\mu\nu}_{\alpha \beta}Z_{\mu\nu} + (C\gamma)^{\mu\nu\rho\sigma\gamma}_{\alpha \beta}Z_{\mu\nu\rho\sigma\gamma},$$

where $C$ is the charge conjugation operator which ensures that the combination $C\gamma^{\mu_1\cdots \mu_n}$ is either symmetric or antisymmetric. (Note: Sometimes gamma matrices with lowered indices are defined as ones contracted with the charge conjugation matrix $\gamma_{\alpha\beta}^\mu = (\gamma^\mu)_\alpha{}^\delta C_{\delta \beta}$, which is equivalent to $C\gamma^\mu$ for the notation used here.) Since the anticommutator is symmetric, the only admissible entries on the right-hand side are those which are symmetric on their spinor indices, which in eleven dimensions only occurs for one, two, and five spacetime indices, with the rest being equivalent up to Poincaré duality. The corresponding coefficients $Z_{\mu\nu}$ and $Z_{\mu\nu\rho\sigma\gamma}$ are known as quasi-central charges. They aren't regular central charges in the group theoretic sense since they are not Lorentz scalars and so do not commute with the Lorentz generators, but their interpretation is the same. They indicate that there are extended objects that preserve some amount of supersymmetry, these being the M2-brane and the M5-brane. Additionally, there is no R-symmetry group.

=== Supergravity action ===
The action for eleven-dimensional supergravity is given by

$$S = \frac{1}{2\kappa_{11}^2}\int d^{11} x \ e \bigg[ R(\omega) -\bar \psi_\mu \gamma^{\mu\nu\rho}D_\nu(\tfrac{1}{2}(\omega+\hat \omega))\psi_\rho - \frac{1}{24}F_{\mu\nu\rho\sigma}F^{\mu\nu\rho\sigma}$$
$$-\frac{\sqrt 2}{192} (\bar \psi_\nu \gamma^{\alpha \beta \gamma \delta \nu \rho}\psi_\rho+12 \bar \psi^\gamma \gamma^{\alpha \beta}\psi^\delta)(F_{\alpha \beta \gamma \delta}+\hat F_{\alpha \beta \gamma \delta})$$
$$-\frac{2\sqrt 2}{(144)^2}\epsilon^{\alpha \beta \gamma \delta \alpha'\beta'\gamma'\delta'\mu\nu\rho}F_{\alpha\beta \gamma \delta}F_{\alpha'\beta'\gamma'\delta'}A_{\mu \nu \rho}\bigg].$$

Here gravity is described using the vielbein formalism $e^a_\mu$ with an eleven-dimensional gravitational coupling constant $\kappa_{11}$ (Note: This is related to the 11-dimensional gravitational constant and Planck mass through $\kappa_{11}^2 = 8\pi G^{(11)} = (M_P^{(11)})^{-9}$.) and

$$\omega_{\mu a b} = \omega_{\mu a b}(e)+K_{\mu ab},$$
$$\hat \omega_{\mu a b} = \omega_{\mu ab} - \tfrac{1}{8}\bar \psi_\nu \gamma^{\nu \rho}{}_{\mu ab} \psi_\rho,$$
$$K_{\mu ab} = -\tfrac{1}{4}(\bar \psi_\mu \gamma_b \psi_a -\bar \psi_a \gamma_\mu \psi_b + \bar \psi_b \gamma_a \psi_\mu)+\tfrac{1}{8} \bar \psi_\nu \gamma^{\nu \rho}{}_{\mu ab}\psi_\rho,$$
$$\hat F_{\mu \nu \rho \sigma} = F_{\mu\nu\rho \sigma} +\tfrac{3}{2}\sqrt 2 \bar \psi_{[\mu}\gamma_{\nu \rho}\psi_{\sigma]}.$$

The torsion-free connection is given by $\omega_{\mu ab}(e)$, while $K_{\mu ab}$ is the contorsion tensor. Meanwhile, $D_\nu(\omega)$ is the covariant derivative with a spin connection $\omega$, which acting on spinors takes the form

$$D_\mu(\omega)\psi_\nu = \partial_\mu\psi_\nu+\tfrac{1}{4}\omega_\mu^{ab}\gamma_{ab}\psi_\nu,$$

where $\gamma_{ab} = \gamma_{[a}\gamma_{b]}$. The regular gamma matrices satisfying the Dirac algebra are denote by $\gamma_a$, while $\gamma_\mu = e_\mu^a\gamma_a$ are position-dependent fields. The first line in the action contains the covariantized kinetic terms given by the Einstein–Hilbert action, the Rarita–Schwinger equation, and the gauge kinetic action. The second line corresponds to cubic graviton-gauge field terms along with some quartic gravitino terms. The last line in the Lagrangian is a Chern–Simons term. (Note: It can be expressed as $-\tfrac{M_P^2\sqrt 2}{6}\int F \wedge F \wedge A$. In principle there are two different 11D supergravities related by the field redefinition $A\rightarrow -A$ that change the sign of this topological term.)

The supersymmetry transformation rules are given by

$$\delta_s e^a_\mu = \tfrac{1}{2}\bar \epsilon \gamma^a \psi_\mu,$$
$$\delta_s \psi_\mu = D_\mu(\hat \omega)\epsilon + \tfrac{\sqrt 2}{288}(\gamma^{\alpha \beta \gamma \delta}{}_\mu - 8 \gamma^{\beta \gamma \delta}\delta^\alpha_\mu) \hat F_{\alpha \beta \gamma \delta}\epsilon,$$
$$\delta_s A_{\mu \nu \rho} = -\tfrac{3\sqrt2}{4}\bar \epsilon \gamma_{[\mu\nu}\psi_{\rho]},$$

where $\epsilon$ is the supersymmetry Majorana gauge parameter. All hatted variables are supercovariant in the sense that they do not depend on the derivative of the supersymmetry parameter $\partial_\mu \epsilon$. The action is additionally invariant under parity, with the gauge field transforming as a pseudotensor $A\rightarrow -A$. The equations of motion for this supergravity also have a rigid symmetry known as the trombone symmetry under which $g_{\mu\nu}\rightarrow \alpha^2 g_{\mu\nu}$ and $A_{\mu\nu\rho}\rightarrow \alpha^3 A_{\mu\nu\rho}$.

=== Special solutions ===
There are a number of special solutions in 11D supergravity, with the most notable ones being the pp-wave, M2-branes, M5-branes, KK-monopoles, and the M9-brane. Brane solutions are solitonic objects within supergravity that are the low-energy limit of the corresponding M-theory branes. The 3-form gauge field couples electrically to M2-branes and magnetically to M5-branes. Explicit supergravity solitonic solutions for the M2-branes and M5-branes are known.

M2-branes and M5-branes have a regular non-degenerate event horizon whose constant time cross-sections are topologically 7-spheres and 4-spheres, respectively. The near-horizon limit of the extreme M2-brane is given by an $AdS_4 \times S^7$ geometry while for the extreme M5-brane it is given by $AdS_7 \times S^4$. These extreme-limit solutions preserve half of the supersymmetry of the vacuum solution, meaning that both the extreme M2-branes and the M5-branes can be seen as solitons interpolating between two maximally supersymmetric Minkowski vacua at infinity, with an $AdS_4\times S^7$ or $AdS_6 \times S^4$ horizon, respectively.

== Compactification ==
The Freund–Rubin compactification of 11D supergravity shows that it preferentially compactifies to seven and four dimensions, the latter of which led to it being extensively studied throughout the 1980s. This compactification is most easily achieved by demanding that the compact and noncompact manifolds have a Ricci tensor that is proportional to the metric, meaning that they are Einstein manifolds. One additionally demands that the solution is stable against fluctuations, which in anti-de Sitter spacetimes requires that the Bretenlohner–Freedman bound is satisfied. Stability is guaranteed if there is some unbroken supersymmetry, although there also exist classically stable solutions that fully break supersymmetry.

One of the main compactification manifolds studied was the 7-sphere. The manifold has 8 Killing spinors, meaning that the resulting four dimensional theory has $\mathcal N = 8$ supersymmetry. Additionally, it also results in an $\text{SO}(8)$ gauge group, corresponding to the isometry group of the sphere. A similar widely studied compactification was using a squashed 7-sphere, which can be acquired by embedding the 7-sphere in a quaternionic projective space, with this giving a gauge group of $\text{SO}(5)\times \text{SU}(2)$.

A key property of 7-sphere Kaluza-Klein compactifications is that their truncation is consistent, which is not necessarily the case for other Einstein manifolds besides the 7-torus. An inconsistent truncation means that the resulting four dimensional theory is not consistent with the higher dimensional field equations. Physically this needs not be a problem in compactifications to Minkowski spacetimes as the inconsistent truncation merely results in additional irrelevant operators in the action. However, most Einstein manifold compactifications are to anti-de Sitter spacetimes which have a relatively large cosmological constant. In this case irrelevant operators can be converted to relevant ones through the equation of motion. (Note: For example, a dimension six operator can be converted into a dimension four one using the cosmological constant $RF^2 \sim \Lambda F^2$, which arises from the field equation $R\sim \Lambda$ for anti-de Sitter spacetimes.)

== Related theories ==
While eleven-dimensional supergravity is the unique supergravity in eleven dimensions at the level of an action, a related theory can be acquired at the level of the equations of motion, known as modified 11D supergravity. (Note: It is sometimes referred to as MM theory) This is done by replacing the spin connection by one that is conformally related to the original. Such a theory is inequivalent to standard 11D supergravity only in spaces that are not simply connected. An action for a massive 11D theory can also be acquired by introducing an auxiliary nondynamical Killing vector field, with this theory reducing to massive type IIA supergravity upon dimensional reduction. This is not a proper eleven-dimensional theory since the fields explicitly do not depend on one of the coordinates, but it is nonetheless useful for studying massive branes.

Dimensionally reducing 11D supergravity to ten dimensions gives rise to type IIA supergravity, while dimensionally reducing it to four dimensions can give $\mathcal N = 8$ supergravity, which was one of the original motivations for constructing the theory. While eleven-dimensional supergravity is not UV finite, it is the low energy limit of M-theory. The supergravity also receives corrections at the quantum level, where these corrections sometimes playing an important role in various compactification mechanisms.

Unlike for supergravity in other dimensions, an extension to eleven dimensional anti-de Sitter spacetime does not exist. While the theory is the supersymmetric theory in the highest number of dimensions, the caveat is that this only holds for spacetime signatures with one temporal dimension. If arbitrary spacetime signatures are allowed, then there also exists a supergravity in twelve dimensions with two temporal dimensions.

== See also ==
- Exceptional field theory
