= Higher-dimensional supergravity =

General relativity in M-theory

Higher-dimensional supergravity is the supersymmetric generalization of general relativity in higher dimensions. Supergravity can be formulated in any number of dimensions up to eleven. This article focuses upon supergravity (SUGRA) in greater than four dimensions.

== Supermultiplets ==
Fields related by supersymmetry transformations form a supermultiplet; the one that contains a graviton is called the supergravity multiplet.

The name of a supergravity theory generally includes the number of dimensions of spacetime that it inhabits, and also the number $\mathcal{N}$ of gravitinos that it has. Sometimes one also includes the choices of supermultiplets in the name of theory. For example, an $\mathcal{N}=2$, (9 + 1)-dimensional supergravity enjoys 9 spatial dimensions, one time and 2 gravitinos. While the field content of different supergravity theories varies considerably, all supergravity theories contain at least one gravitino and they all contain a single graviton. Thus every supergravity theory contains a single supergravity supermultiplet. It is still not known whether one can construct theories with multiple gravitons that are not equivalent to multiple decoupled theories with a single graviton in each. In maximal supergravity theories (see below), all fields are related by supersymmetry transformations so that there is only one supermultiplet: the supergravity multiplet.

== Gauged supergravity versus Yang–Mills supergravity ==
Often an abuse of nomenclature is used when "gauge supergravity" refers to a supergravity theory in which fields in the theory are charged with respect to vector fields in the theory. However, when the distinction is important, the following is the correct nomenclature. If a global (i.e. rigid) R-symmetry is gauged, the gravitino is charged with respect to some vector fields, and the theory is called gauged supergravity. When other global (rigid) symmetries (e.g., if the theory is a non-linear sigma model) of the theory are gauged such that some (non-gravitino) fields are charged with respect to vectors, it is known as a Yang–Mills–Einstein supergravity theory. Of course, one can imagine having a "gauged Yang–Mills–Einstein" theory using a combination of the above gaugings.

== Counting gravitinos ==
Gravitinos are fermions, which means that according to the spin-statistics theorem they must have an odd number of spinorial indices. In fact the gravitino field has one spinor and one vector index, which means that gravitinos transform as a tensor product of a spinorial representation and the vector representation of the Lorentz group. This is a Rarita–Schwinger spinor.

While there is only one vector representation for each Lorentz group, in general there are several different spinorial representations. Technically these are really representations of the double cover of the Lorentz group called a spin group.

The canonical example of a spinorial representation is the Dirac spinor, which exists in every number of space-time dimensions. However the Dirac spinor representation is not always irreducible. When calculating the number $\mathcal{N}$, one always counts the number of real irreducible representations. The spinors with spins less than 3/2 that exist in each number of dimensions will be classified in the following subsection.

== A classification of spinors ==
The available spinor representations depends on k; the maximal compact subgroup of the little group of the Lorentz group that preserves the momentum of a massless particle is Spin(d − 1) × Spin(d − k − 1), where k is equal to the number d of spatial dimensions minus the number d − k of time dimensions. (See helicity (particle physics)) For example, in our world, this is 3 − 1 = 2. Due to the mod 8 Bott periodicity of the homotopy groups of the Lorentz group, really we only need to consider k modulo 8.

For any value of k there is a Dirac representation, which is always of real dimension $2^{1+\lfloor{\frac{2d-k}{2}}\rfloor}$ where $\lfloor x\rfloor$ is the greatest integer less than or equal to x. When $-2\leq k\leq 2 \pmod 8$ there is a real Majorana spinor representation, whose dimension is half that of the Dirac representation. When k is even there is a Weyl spinor representation, whose real dimension is again half that of the Dirac spinor. Finally when k is divisible by eight, that is, when k is zero modulo eight, there is a Majorana–Weyl spinor, whose real dimension is one quarter that of the Dirac spinor.

Occasionally one also considers symplectic Majorana spinor which exist when $3\leq k\leq 5$, which have half has many components as Dirac spinors. When k=4 these may also be Weyl, yielding Weyl symplectic Majorana spinors which have one quarter as many components as Dirac spinors.

== Choosing chiralities ==
Spinors in n-dimensions are representations (really modules) not only of the n-dimensional Lorentz group, but also of a Lie algebra called the n-dimensional Clifford algebra. The most commonly used basis of the complex $2^{\lfloor n\rfloor}$-dimensional representation of the Clifford algebra, the representation that acts on the Dirac spinors, consists of the gamma matrices.

When n is even the product of all of the gamma matrices, which is often referred to as $\Gamma_5$ as it was first considered in the case n = 4, is not itself a member of the Clifford algebra. However, being a product of elements of the Clifford algebra, it is in the algebra's universal cover and so has an action on the Dirac spinors.

In particular, the Dirac spinors may be decomposed into eigenspaces of $\Gamma_5$ with eigenvalues equal to $\pm(-1)^{-k/2}$, where k is the number of spatial minus temporal dimensions in the spacetime. The spinors in these two eigenspaces each form projective representations of the Lorentz group, known as Weyl spinors. The eigenvalue under $\Gamma_5$ is known as the chirality of the spinor, which can be left or right-handed.

A particle that transforms as a single Weyl spinor is said to be chiral. The CPT theorem, which is required by Lorentz invariance in Minkowski space, implies that when there is a single time direction such particles have antiparticles of the opposite chirality.

Recall that the eigenvalues of $\Gamma_5$, whose eigenspaces are the two chiralities, are $\pm(-1)^{-k/2}$. In particular, when k is equal to two modulo four the two eigenvalues are complex conjugate and so the two chiralities of Weyl representations are complex conjugate representations.

Complex conjugation in quantum theories corresponds to time inversion. Therefore, the CPT theorem implies that when the number of Minkowski dimensions is divisible by four (so that k is equal to 2 modulo 4) there be an equal number of left-handed and right-handed supercharges. On the other hand, if the dimension is equal to 2 modulo 4, there can be different numbers of left and right-handed supercharges, and so often one labels the theory by a doublet $\mathcal{N}=(\mathcal{N}_L,\mathcal{N}_R)$ where $\mathcal{N}_L$ and $\mathcal{N}_R$ are the number of left-handed and right-handed supercharges respectively.

== Counting supersymmetries ==
All supergravity theories are invariant under transformations in the super-Poincaré algebra, although individual configurations are not in general invariant under every transformation in this group. The super-Poincaré group is generated by the Super-Poincaré algebra, which is a Lie superalgebra. A Lie superalgebra is a $\mathbf{Z}_2$ graded algebra in which the elements of degree zero are called bosonic and those of degree one are called fermionic. A commutator, that is an antisymmetric bracket satisfying the Jacobi identity is defined between each pair of generators of fixed degree except for pairs of fermionic generators, for which instead one defines a symmetric bracket called an anticommutator.

The fermionic generators are also called supercharges. Any configuration which is invariant under any of the supercharges is said to be BPS, and often nonrenormalization theorems demonstrate that such states are particularly easily treated because they are unaffected by many quantum corrections.

The supercharges transform as spinors, and the number of irreducible spinors of these fermionic generators is equal to the number of gravitinos $\mathcal{N}$ defined above. Often $\mathcal{N}$ is defined to be the number of fermionic generators, instead of the number of gravitinos, because this definition extends to supersymmetric theories without gravity.

Sometimes it is convenient to characterize theories not by the number $\mathcal{N}$ of irreducible representations of gravitinos or supercharges, but instead by the total Q of their dimensions. This is because some features of the theory have the same Q-dependence in any number of dimensions. For example, one is often only interested in theories in which all particles have spin less than or equal to two. This requires that Q not exceed 32, except possibly in special cases in which the supersymmetry is realized in an unconventional, nonlinear fashion with products of bosonic generators in the anticommutators of the fermionic generators.

== Examples ==
=== Maximal supergravity ===
The supergravity theories that have attracted the most interest contain no spins higher than two. This means, in particular, that they do not contain any fields that transform as symmetric tensors of rank higher than two under Lorentz transformations. The consistency of interacting higher spin field theories is, however, presently a field of very active interest.

The supercharges in every super-Poincaré algebra are generated by a multiplicative basis of m fundamental supercharges, and an additive basis of the supercharges (this definition of supercharges is a bit more broad than that given above) is given by a product of any subset of these m fundamental supercharges. The number of subsets of m elements is 2^{m}, thus the space of supercharges is 2^{m}-dimensional.

The fields in a supersymmetric theory form representations of the super-Poincaré algebra. It can be shown that when m is greater than 5 there are no representations that contain only fields of spin less than or equal to two. Thus we are interested in the case in which m is less than or equal to 5, which means that the maximal number of supercharges is 32. A supergravity theory with precisely 32 supersymmetries is known as a maximal supergravity.

Above we saw that the number of supercharges in a spinor depends on the dimension and the signature of spacetime. The supercharges occur in spinors. Thus the above limit on the number of supercharges cannot be satisfied in a spacetime of arbitrary dimension. Below we will describe some of the cases in which it is satisfied.

=== A 12-dimensional two-time theory ===
The highest dimension in which spinors exist with only 32 supercharges is 12. If there are 11 spatial directions and 1 time direction then there will be Weyl and Majorana spinors which both are of dimension 64, and so are too large. However, some authors have considered nonlinear actions of the supersymmetry in which higher spin fields may not appear.

If instead one considers 10 spatial direction and a second temporal dimension then there is a Majorana–Weyl spinor, which as desired has only 32 components. For an overview of two-time theories by one of their main proponents, Itzhak Bars, see his paper Two-Time Physics and Two-Time Physics on arxiv.org. He considered 12-dimensional supergravity in Supergravity, p-brane duality and hidden space and time dimensions.

It was widely, but not universally, thought that two-time theories may have problems. For example, there could be causality problems (disconnect between cause and effect) and unitarity problems (negative probability, ghosts). Also, the Hamiltonian-based approach to quantum mechanics may have to be modified in the presence of a second Hamiltonian for the other time. However, in Two-Time Physics it was demonstrated that such potential problems are solved with an appropriate gauge symmetry.

Some other two time theories describe low-energy behavior, such as Cumrun Vafa's F-theory that is also formulated with the help of 12 dimensions. F-theory itself however is not a two-time theory. One can understand 2 of the 12-dimensions of F-theory as a bookkeeping device; they should not be confused with the other 10 spacetime coordinates. These two dimensions are somehow dual to each other and should not be treated independently.

=== 11-dimensional maximal SUGRA ===
This maximal supergravity is the classical limit of M-theory. Classically, we have only one 11-dimensional supergravity theory: 7D hyperspace + 4 common dimensions. Like all maximal supergravities, it contains a single supermultiplet, the supergravity supermultiplet containing the graviton, a Majorana gravitino, and a 3-form gauge field often called the C-field.

It contains two p-brane solutions, a 2-brane and a 5-brane, which are electrically and magnetically charged, respectively, with respect to the C-field. This means that 2-brane and 5-brane charge are the violations of the Bianchi identities for the dual C-field and original C-field respectively. The supergravity 2-brane and 5-brane are the long-wavelength limits (see also the historical survey above) of the M2-brane and M5-brane in M-theory.

=== 10d SUGRA theories ===
==== Type IIA SUGRA: N = (1, 1) ====
This maximal supergravity is the classical limit of type IIA string theory. The field content of the supergravity supermultiplet consists of a graviton, a Majorana gravitino, a Kalb–Ramond field, odd-dimensional Ramond–Ramond gauge potentials, a dilaton and a dilatino.

The Bianchi identities of the Ramond–Ramond gauge potentials $C_{2k-1}$ can be violated by adding sources $\rho$, which are called D(8 − 2k)-branes

$$ddC_{2k-1}=\rho. \,\,\,$$

In the democratic formulation of type IIA supergravity there exist Ramond–Ramond gauge potentials for 0 < k < 6, which leads to D0-branes (also called D-particles), D2-branes, D4-branes, D6-branes and, if one includes the case k = 0, D8-branes. In addition there are fundamental strings and their electromagnetic duals, which are called NS5-branes.

Although obviously there are no −1-form gauge connections, the corresponding 0-form field strength, G_{0} may exist. This field strength is called the Romans mass and when it is not equal to zero the supergravity theory is called massive IIA supergravity or Romans IIA supergravity. From the above Bianchi identity we see that a D8-brane is a domain wall between zones of differing G_{0}, thus in the presence of a D8-brane at least part of the spacetime will be described by the Romans theory.

==== IIA SUGRA from 11d SUGRA ====
IIA SUGRA is the dimensional reduction of 11-dimensional supergravity on a circle. This means that 11d supergravity on the spacetime $M^{10}\times S^1\,$ is equivalent to IIA supergravity on the 10-manifold $M^{10}\,$ where one eliminates modes with masses proportional to the inverse radius of the circle S^{1}.

In particular the field and brane content of IIA supergravity can be derived via this dimensional reduction procedure. The field $G_0$ however does not arise from the dimensional reduction, massive IIA is not known to be the dimensional reduction of any higher-dimensional theory. The 1-form Ramond–Ramond potential $C_1\,$ is the usual 1-form connection that arises from the Kaluza–Klein procedure, it arises from the components of the 11-d metric that contain one index along the compactified circle. The IIA 3-form gauge potential $C_3\,$ is the reduction of the 11d 3-form gauge potential components with indices that do not lie along the circle, while the IIA Kalb–Ramond 2-form B-field consists of those components of the 11-dimensional 3-form with one index along the circle. The higher forms in IIA are not independent degrees of freedom, but are obtained from the lower forms using Hodge duality.

Similarly the IIA branes descend from the 11-dimension branes and geometry. The IIA D0-brane is a Kaluza–Klein momentum mode along the compactified circle. The IIA fundamental string is an 11-dimensional membrane which wraps the compactified circle. The IIA D2-brane is an 11-dimensional membrane that does not wrap the compactified circle. The IIA D4-brane is an 11-dimensional 5-brane that wraps the compactified circle. The IIA NS5-brane is an 11-dimensional 5-brane that does not wrap the compactified circle. The IIA D6-brane is a Kaluza–Klein monopole, that is, a topological defect in the compact circle fibration. The lift of the IIA D8-brane to 11-dimensions is not known, as one side of the IIA geometry as a nontrivial Romans mass, and an 11-dimensional original of the Romans mass is unknown.

==== Type IIB SUGRA: N = (2, 0) ====
This maximal supergravity is the classical limit of type IIB string theory. The field content of the supergravity supermultiplet consists of a graviton, a Weyl gravitino, a Kalb–Ramond field, even-dimensional Ramond–Ramond gauge potentials, a dilaton and a dilatino.

The Ramond–Ramond fields are sourced by odd-dimensional D(2k + 1)-branes, which host supersymmetric U(1) gauge theories. As in IIA supergravity, the fundamental string is an electric source for the Kalb–Ramond B-field and the NS5-brane is a magnetic source. Unlike that of the IIA theory, the NS5-brane hosts a worldvolume U(1) supersymmetric gauge theory with $\mathcal N=(1,1)$ supersymmetry, although some of this supersymmetry may be broken depending on the geometry of the spacetime and the other branes that are present.

This theory enjoys an SL(2, R) symmetry known as S-duality that interchanges the Kalb–Ramond field and the RR 2-form and also mixes the dilaton and the RR 0-form axion.

==== Type I gauged SUGRA: N = (1, 0) ====
These are the classical limits of type I string theory and the two heterotic string theories. There is a single Majorana–Weyl spinor of supercharges, which in 10 dimensions contains 16 supercharges. As 16 is less than 32, the maximal number of supercharges, type I is not a maximal supergravity theory.

In particular this implies that there is more than one variety of supermultiplet. In fact, there are two. As usual, there is a supergravity supermultiplet. This is smaller than the supergravity supermultiplet in type II, it contains only the graviton, a Majorana–Weyl gravitino, a 2-form gauge potential, the dilaton and a dilatino. Whether this 2-form is considered to be a Kalb–Ramond field or Ramond–Ramond field depends on whether one considers the supergravity theory to be a classical limit of a heterotic string theory or type I string theory. There is also a vector supermultiplet, which contains a one-form gauge potential called a gluon and also a Majorana–Weyl gluino.

Unlike type IIA and IIB supergravities, for which the classical theory is unique, as a classical theory $\mathcal{N}=1$ supergravity is consistent with a single supergravity supermultiplet and any number of vector multiplets. It is also consistent without the supergravity supermultiplet, but then it would contain no graviton and so would not be a supergravity theory. While one may add multiple supergravity supermultiplets, it is not known if they may consistently interact. One is free not only to determine the number, if any, of vector supermultiplets, but also there is some freedom in determining their couplings. They must describe a classical super Yang–Mills gauge theory, but the choice of gauge group is arbitrary. In addition one is free to make some choices of gravitational couplings in the classical theory.

While there are many varieties of classical $\mathcal{N}=1$ supergravities, not all of these varieties are the classical limits of quantum theories. Generically the quantum versions of these theories suffer from various anomalies, as can be seen already at 1-loop in the hexagon Feynman diagrams. In 1984 and 1985 Michael Green and John H. Schwarz have shown that if one includes precisely 496 vector supermultiplets and chooses certain couplings of the 2-form and the metric then the gravitational anomalies cancel. This is called the Green–Schwarz anomaly cancellation mechanism.

In addition, anomaly cancellation requires one to cancel the gauge anomalies. This fixes the gauge symmetry algebra to be either $\mathfrak{so}(32)$, $\mathfrak{e}_8 \oplus \mathfrak{e}_8$, $\mathfrak{e}_8 \oplus 248\mathfrak{u}(1)$ or $496\mathfrak{u}(1)$. However, only the first two Lie algebras can be gotten from superstring theory. Quantum theories with at least 8 supercharges tend to have continuous moduli spaces of vacua. In compactifications of these theories, which have 16 supercharges, there exist degenerate vacua with different values of various Wilson loops. Such Wilson loops may be used to break the gauge symmetries to various subgroups. In particular the above gauge symmetries may be broken to obtain not only the standard model gauge symmetry but also symmetry groups such as SO(10) and SU(5) that are popular in GUT theories.

=== 9d SUGRA theories ===
In 9-dimensional Minkowski space the only irreducible spinor representation is the Majorana spinor, which has 16 components. Thus supercharges inhabit Majorana spinors of which there are at most two.

==== Maximal 9d SUGRA from 10d ====
In particular, if there are two Majorana spinors then one obtains the 9-dimensional maximal supergravity theory. Recall that in 10 dimensions there were two inequivalent maximal supergravity theories, IIA and IIB. The dimensional reduction of either IIA or IIB on a circle is the unique 9-dimensional supergravity. In other words, IIA or IIB on the product of a 9-dimensional space M^{9} and a circle is equivalent to the 9-dimension theory on M^{9}, with Kaluza–Klein modes if one does not take the limit in which the circle shrinks to zero.

==== T-duality ====
More generally one could consider the 10-dimensional theory on a nontrivial circle bundle over M^{9}. Dimensional reduction still leads to a 9-dimensional theory on M^{9}, but with a 1-form gauge potential equal to the connection of the circle bundle and a 2-form field strength which is equal to the Chern class of the old circle bundle. One may then lift this theory to the other 10-dimensional theory, in which case one finds that the 1-form gauge potential lifts to the Kalb–Ramond field. Similarly, the connection of the fibration of the circle in the second 10-dimensional theory is the integral of the Kalb–Ramond field of the original theory over the compactified circle.

This transformation between the two 10-dimensional theories is known as T-duality. While T-duality in supergravity involves dimensional reduction and so loses information, in the full quantum string theory the extra information is stored in string winding modes and so T-duality is a duality between the two 10-dimensional theories. The above construction can be used to obtain the relation between the circle bundle's connection and dual Kalb–Ramond field even in the full quantum theory.

==== N = 1 gauged SUGRA ====
As was the case in the parent 10-dimensional theory, 9-dimensional N=1 supergravity contains a single supergravity multiplet and an arbitrary number of vector multiplets. These vector multiplets may be coupled so as to admit arbitrary gauge theories, although not all possibilities have quantum completions. Unlike the 10-dimensional theory, as was described in the previous subsection, the supergravity multiplet itself contains a vector and so there will always be at least a U(1) gauge symmetry, even in the N=2 case.

== The mathematics ==
The Lagrangian for 11D supergravity found by brute force by Cremmer, Julia and Scherk is:

$$\begin{array}{rcl}
L &=& +\frac{1}{2\kappa^2}eR-\frac12e\overline{\psi}_M\Gamma^{MNP}D_N[\frac12(\omega-\overline{\omega})]\psi_P\\
&&+\frac{1}{48}eF^2_{MNPQ}+\frac{\sqrt{2}\kappa}{384}e(\overline{\psi}_M\Gamma^{MNPQRS}\psi_S\\
&&+12\overline{\psi}^N\Gamma^{PQ}\psi^R)(F+\overline{F})_{NPQR}+\frac{\sqrt{2}\kappa}{3456}\varepsilon^{M_1\dots M_{11}}F_{M_1\dots M_4}F_{M_5\dots M_8}A_{M_9 M_{10} M_{11}}
\end{array}$$

which contains the three types of field:

$$e^A_M,\psi_M,A_{MNP}$$

The symmetry of this supergravity theory is given by the supergroup OSp(1|32) which gives the subgroups O(1) for the bosonic symmetry and Sp(32) for the fermion symmetry. This is because spinors need 32 components in 11 dimensions. 11D supergravity can be compactified down to 4 dimensions which then has OSp(8|4) symmetry. (We still have 8 × 4 = 32 so there are still the same number of components.) Spinors need 4 components in 4 dimensions. This gives O(8) for the gauge group which is too small to contain the Standard Model gauge group U(1) × SU(2) × SU(3) which would need at least O(10).
