= Stanley Deser =

American physicist (1931–2023)

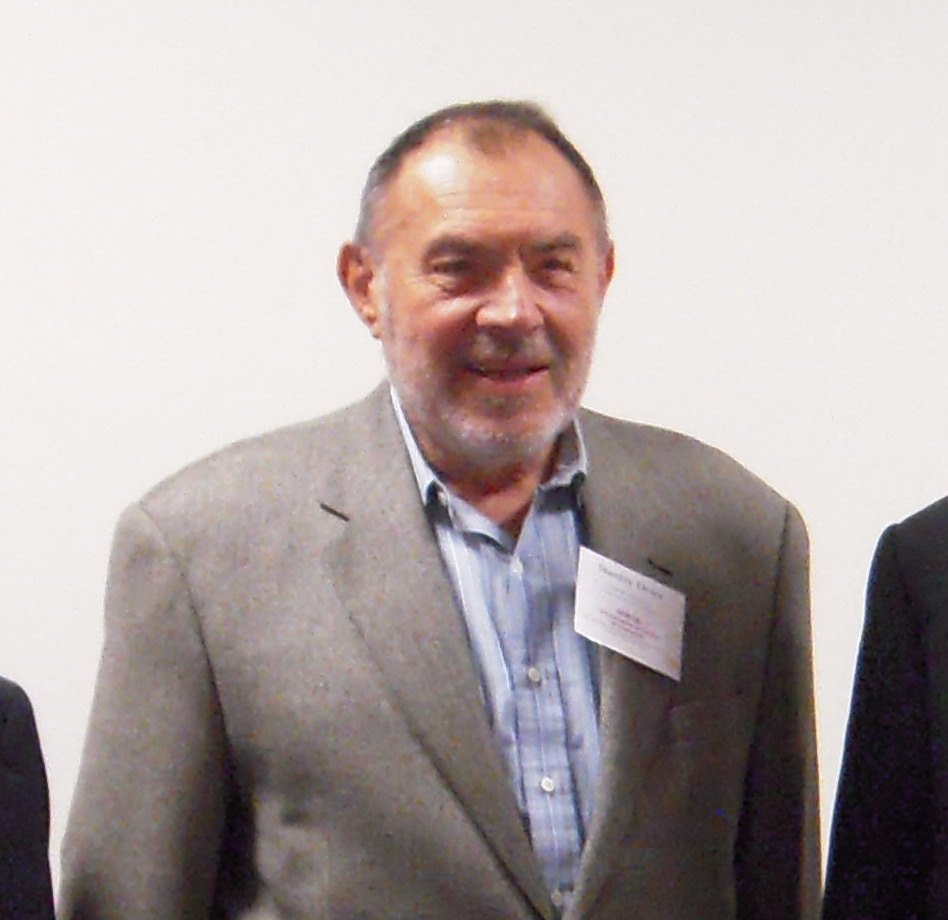
- Born: March 19, 1931; Równe, Poland (now Rivne, Ukraine)
- Died: April 21, 2023 (aged 92); Pasadena, California, U.S.
- Citizenship: American
- Education: Harvard University (Ph.D)
- Known for: ADM formalism Boulware–Deser ghost Quantum gravity Pure 4D N = 1 supergravity Conformal anomaly 2+1 dimensional gravities and Chern–Simons quantum field theory Partially massless systems in anti-de Sitter space
- Awards: Einstein Medal, Dannie Heineman Prize, Guggenheim Fellow, Fulbright Fellow, Fellow of the American Physical Society, National Academy of Sciences, American Academy of Arts and Sciences, Accademia delle Scienze di Torino, Italy
- Scientific career
- Fields: Theoretical physics
- Workplaces: California Institute of Technology, Brandeis University
- Doctoral advisor: Julian Seymour Schwinger
- Notable students: Lee Smolin

Stanley Deser (March 19, 1931 – April 21, 2023) was an American physicist known for his contributions to general relativity. He was an emeritus Ancell Professor of Physics at Brandeis University in Waltham, Massachusetts and a senior research associate at California Institute of Technology.

== Biography ==
Born on March 19, 1931, in Równe, Poland (now Rivne, Ukraine). He and his family received visas from Aristides de Sousa Mendes in Bayonne, France on June 21, 1940 enabling them to cross into Portugal, thus saving their lives. They sailed from Lisbon in May 1941 and settled in New York.

Deser earned his B.A. (Summa cum laude) in 1949 at Brooklyn College in New York, and his master's degree 1950 at Harvard, where he also earned his doctorate in 1953, with a thesis entitled "Relativistic Two Body Interactions". From 1953 to 1955, he was at the Institute for Advanced Study in Princeton. He was at the Niels Bohr Institute from 1955 to 1957, and a lecturer at Harvard from 1957 to 1958. He was an invited professor at the Sorbonne during 1966–1967 and 1971–1972, he held a visiting professorship at All Souls College in Oxford in 1977, and a Loeb Lectureship at Harvard in 1975.

In the context of general relativity, he developed, with Richard Arnowitt and Charles Misner, the ADM formalism, roughly speaking a way of describing spacetime as space evolving in time, which allows a recasting Einstein's theory in terms of a more general formalism used in physics to describe dynamical systems, namely the Hamiltonian formalism. In the framework of that formalism, there is also a straightforward way to define globally quantities like energy or, equivalently, mass (so-called ADM mass/energy) which, in general relativity, is not trivial at all. With L. Abbott, Deser extended the notion of energy for gravity with a cosmological constant. And with Claudio Teitelboim he showed that supergravity has positive energy.

Another of Deser's research interests was covariant quantum gravity. Deser applied the new formalism of covariant quantum field theory developed by Gerard 't Hooft and Martinus Veltman in the early 1970s. With Peter van Nieuwenhuizen he demonstrated the one loop nonrenormalizability of general relativity plus electromagnetism, plus Yang-Mills, plus Dirac fermions, and plus a cosmological constant. The apparent impasse revealed by these efforts was partially overcome in 1976, following a strikingly independent approach from the contemporary work of Daniel Freedman, Sergio Ferrara and Peter van Nieuwenhuizen, when Deser and Bruno Zumino demonstrated that a spin 3/2 field can be added to general relativity to produce a consistent, locally supersymmetric theory called supergravity.

In 1994, Deser, along with Arnowitt and Misner, received the Dannie Heineman Prize for Mathematical Physics. Along with Misner he won the 2015 Einstein Medal. He has been a Guggenheim and a Fulbright Fellow, received honorary doctorates from Stockholm University (1978) and the Chalmers Institute of Technology (2001), and he was a fellow of both the American Academy of Arts and Sciences and the United States National Academy of Sciences. In 2004, a conference in his honor was celebrated in Ann Arbor, Michigan. He was made a Foreign Member of the Royal Society in 2021, one of only about 180 worldwide in all sciences.

A conference in honor of Stanley Deser and the ADM collaborators was held in November 2009 at Texas A&M University on the 50th anniversary of their research.

== Personal life and death ==
Deser was married to Swedish artist Elsbeth Deser and had three children. His daughter Clara Deser is a climate scientist at the National Center for Atmospheric Research.

Deser's autobiography, "Forks in the Road", was published in September 2021. He died in Pasadena, California on April 21, 2023, at the age of 92.

== See also ==
- Polyakov action
