= Paul Townsend =

British physicist

Paul Kingsley Townsend (/ˈtaʊnzənd/; born 3 March 1951) is a British physicist, currently a Professor of Theoretical Physics in Cambridge University's Department of Applied Mathematics and Theoretical Physics. He is notable for his work on string theory.

== Education ==
He received his PhD from Brandeis University in 1976 for his dissertation The 1/N expansion of scalar field theories OCLC 22736707 supervised by Howard Joel Schnitzer. Since then he has over 320 publications.

== Work ==
In 1987, Eric Bergshoeff, Ergin Sezgin, and Paul Townsend showed that there are no superstrings in eleven dimensions (the largest number of dimensions consistent with a single graviton in supergravity theories), but supermembranes. In 1977 he was the first to formulate pure 4D N = 1 supergravity in anti-de Sitter space.

== Awards and honours ==
He was elected a Fellow of the Royal Society in May 2000.
