= Gauged supergravity =

Supergravity with gauged R-symmetry

Gauged supergravity is a supergravity theory in which some R-symmetry is gauged such that the gravitinos (superpartners of the graviton) are charged with respect to the gauge fields. Consistency of the supersymmetry transformation often requires the presence of the potential for the scalar fields of the theory, or the cosmological constant if the theory contains no scalar degree of freedom. The gauged supergravity often has the anti-de Sitter space as a supersymmetric vacuum. (A notable exception is a six-dimensional N=(1,0) gauged supergravity.) The theory describing the bulk side of the AdS/CFT correspondence will, in the appropriate limit, generally be a gauged supergravity theory.

"Gauged supergravity" in this sense should be contrasted with Yang–Mills–Einstein supergravity in which some other would-be global symmetries of the theory are gauged and fields other than the gravitinos are charged with respect to the gauge fields.

== See also ==
- Velo–Zwanziger problem
