= Warren Siegel =

American quantum physicist

Warren Siegel (/ˈsiːɡəl/ SEE-gəl) is a theoretical physicist specializing in supersymmetric quantum field theory and string theory. He was a professor at the C. N. Yang Institute for Theoretical Physics at Stony Brook University. He retired in late 2022.

== Background ==
Siegel did his undergraduate and graduate work at the University of California, Berkeley, graduating with a PhD in 1977. Following his graduation he worked at several postdoctoral appointments at Harvard (7/77-7/79), Brandeis University (3/79-6/79), the Institute for Advanced Study (8/79-8/80), Caltech (8/80-8/82) and University of California, Berkeley (8/82-8/85). He served as an assistant professor at the University of Maryland, College Park from 1985 to 1987 before becoming a professor at Stony Brook University in 1987.

== Research ==
His early work involved the use of Superspace to treat supersymmetric theories, including supergravity. Along with S.J. Gates, M.T. Grisaru, and M. Rocek he discovered methods for both deriving classical actions, and performing Feynman graph calculations more simply than those in Non-Supersymmetric theories. He discovered a new version of dimensional regularization ("dimensional reduction") which preserves supersymmetry, and is also commonly used in quantum chromodynamics (QCD). The first supersymmetric nonrenormalization theorem was introduced by Grisaru, Siegel and Rocek in their 1979 paper "Improved methods for Supergraphs", which has close to 700 citations.

During the 1980s, Siegel invented covariant string field theory and began to pioneer research in string field theory. With Barton Zwiebach he generalized methods outside of string theory to give a universal free field theory action for arbitrary representations of the Poincaré group in arbitrary dimensions. He also introduced new gauge symmetries of classical mechanics useful for strings.

In subsequent work, Siegel made contributions to physicist's understanding of duality, conformal invariance, AdS/CFT, the random matrix approach to string theory, twistor superstrings, and other topics in string theory. His most recent work has been on N=4 supersymmetric Yang-Mills.

== Textbooks ==
Siegel authored an extensive (1078pg) textbook called Fields, now in its 4th edition. It is notable in that it follows a very modern approach and incorporates many topics (including string theory) not found in other field theory textbooks. He advocates a "symmetry-based" approach and uses this in his Quantum Field Theory I & II classes. The textbook is also notable in that it is completely an "electronic book" and can be downloaded for free from Siegel's website. He also offers his 1988 textbook Introduction to String Field Theory for free online. Along with S.J. Gates, M.T. Grisaru and M. Rocek he co-authored the 1983 textbook Superspace, or One thousand and one lessons in supersymmetry. It can now be downloaded for free from arXiv.org. He served as a co-editor of the Concise Encyclopedia of Supersymmetry and Noncommutative Structures in Mathematics and Physics.
