= Concise Encyclopedia of Supersymmetry and Noncommutative Structures in Mathematics and Physics =

Mathematics and physics encyclopedia

Concise Encyclopedia of Supersymmetry: And Noncommutative Structures in Mathematics and Physics
- Cover of the Second printing (Springer, 2005)
- Author: Jonathan Bagger, Warren Siegel; Steven Duplij (editors)
- Language: English
- Subject: Mathematics, Physics
- Genre: Reference
- Publisher: Kluwer Academic Publishers, 2004 * Springer, 2005
- Publication place: Netherlands
- Pages: 561 pp.
- ISBN: 978-1-4020-1338-6

Concise Encyclopedia of Supersymmetry and Noncommutative Structures in Mathematics and Physics is a fundamental authoritative text in specialized areas of contemporary mathematics and physics. This is an English language reference work which consists of around 800 original articles by around 280 scientists under the guidance of 23 advisory board members.

== Publication history ==
The first edition was published by Kluwer Academic Publishers in 2004, when Kluwer was a part of Springer. A second printing with corrections was issued in 2005 by Springer Science & Business Media.

== Contents ==
Concise Encyclopedia of Supersymmetry contains articles devoted to supergravity, M-theory, quantum gravity, quantum groups, noncommutative geometry and other topics related to supersymmetry. The articles are of the following kinds: 1) short review; 2) term/notion definition; 3) biography. The detailed Subject Index consists of 31 four-column oversized pages and is of three level, which makes easier navigation through the volume. A useful list of 116 abbreviations helps to understand special articles on supersymmetry also in other sources. The book can serve as a working instrument for professionals and PhD students.

== Editions ==
- Duplij, Steven; Siegel, Warren; Bagger, Jonathan, eds. (2005), Concise Encyclopedia of Supersymmetry: And Noncommutative Structures in Mathematics and Physics, Berlin, New York: Springer, ISBN 978-1-4020-1338-6
- Duplij, Steven; Wess, Julius, eds. (2001), Noncommutative Structures in Mathematics and Physics, Dordrecht, Boston, London: Kluwer Academic Publishers, ISBN 0-7923-6998-X

== See also ==
- Encyclopedia of Mathematics
