= Peter Freund =

Romanian-American physicist (1936–2018)

Peter G. O. Freund
- Born: September 7, 1936; Timișoara, Kingdom of Romania
- Died: March 6, 2018 (aged 81); Chicago, Illinois, U.S.
- Education: Politehnica University of Timișoara, Romania; University of Vienna, Austria
- Known for: Two-component duality Higher-dimensional unification Freund–Rubin compactification Superstrings from 26 dimensions p-adic strings econophysics
- Spouse: Lucy Freund
- Children: Pauline and Caroline
- Scientific career
- Fields: Physics
- Workplaces: University of Chicago
- Doctoral advisor: Walter Thirring
- Notable students: William Cottrell

Peter George Oliver Freund (7 September 1936, Timișoara – 6 March 2018, Chicago) was a professor of theoretical physics at the University of Chicago. He made important contributions to particle physics and string theory. He was also active as a writer.

== Biography ==
Peter George Oliver Freund was born, raised and educated in the Romanian city of Timișoara. He was of Hungarian-Jewish origin. His father, Josef Freund (1901-1982), was a surgeon and gynecologist, a graduate of universities in Germany, who in 1935 founded a private clinic in the center of Timișoara known as the Freund Sanatorium (Sanatoriul Freund). His mother, Rózsi, a Hungarian opera singer by profession, was born in Lugoj in the family of a well-known textile merchant. His father's family had settled in Timișoara since the beginning of the nineteenth century. Freund lived as a child in the center of Timișoara, in a building known as the "Färber Palace". At the age of 13, Freund was the swimming champion in the 33-meter breaststroke category in a competition between schools in Timișoara. In his hometown he attended the Politehnica University of Timișoara. Because of his participation in an anti-Soviet demonstration in November 1956, Freund was arrested by the communist security police, the Securitate, and lined up with other students between a wall and a line of tanks, essentially an armored firing squad, which, in the reigning confusion, did not fire.

In 1959 he managed to leave Romania. Freund obtained his PhD in theoretical physics at the University of Vienna, with Walter Thirring as his thesis adviser. Since 1965 Freund was on the faculty of the University of Chicago. He lived in Chicago with his wife Lucy, a clinical psychologist. They have two daughters, both married (Pauline, an attorney in Seattle and Caroline, an economist in Washington, D.C.), as well as five grandchildren.

== Research ==
Freund was one of the originators of two-component duality which gave the original impetus to what then developed into string theory. He pioneered the modern unification of physics through the introduction of extra dimensions of space and found mechanisms by which the extra dimensions curl up.

Freund made significant contributions, to the theory of magnetic monopoles, to supersymmetry and supergravity, to number-theoretic aspects of string theory, as well as to the phenomenology of hadrons.

== Writer ==
Beyond his work in theoretical physics, Freund was the author of the book A Passion for Discovery, World Scientific, Singapore, New York, London 2007.

Over the years, in addition to scientific papers, Freund wrote short stories, and in 2001 he began publishing them. His stories appear in the online literary journal Exquisite Corpse and in other journals.

In addition to short stories, Freund wrote two novellas, The Fine Underwear of Consciousness and Upside Down, as well as the novel Belonging. Together with his childhood friend, the Romanian novelist Radu Ciobanu, he wrote in the Romanian language the book Dialog peste Atlantic (Dialog Across the Atlantic), published by Emia in 2006. The book deals with the way two friends, separated for half a century, view world events, arts, science, and ultimately try to catch up on two lives lived under very different conditions: Freund managed to leave Romania for the West, while Radu Ciobanu lived through the horrors of the communist dictatorship.

The book West of West End, a collection of Freund's short stories, appeared in October 2008. Another collection of short stories, Tales in a Minor Key was published in 2012.

== Publications ==
- Freund, P.G.O. (1968). "Finite Energy Sum Rules and Bootstraps". Physical Review Letters. 20 (5): 235–237. Bibcode:1968PhRvL..20..235F. doi:10.1103/PhysRevLett.20.235.
- Freund, P.G.O. (1965). "Relation Between pi-p, p-p, and anti-p-p Scattering at High Energies". Physical Review Letters. 15 (24): 929–930. Bibcode:1965PhRvL..15..929F. doi:10.1103/PhysRevLett.15.929.
- Freund, P.G.O.; Arafune J.; Goebel C. J. (1975). "Topology of Higgs Fields". Journal of Mathematical Physics. 16 (2): 433. Bibcode:1975JMP....16..433A. doi:10.1063/1.522518.
- Freund, P.G.O.; Cho Y.M. (1975). "Nonabelian Gauge Fields as Nambu-Goldstone Fields". Physical Review D. 12 (6): 1711. Bibcode:1975PhRvD..12.1711C. doi:10.1103/PhysRevD.12.1711.
- Freund, P.G.O.; Kaplansky I. (1976). "Simple Supersymmetries". Journal of Mathematical Physics. 17 (2): 228. Bibcode:1976JMP....17..228F. doi:10.1063/1.522885.
- Freund, P.G.O.; Rubin M.A. (1980). "Dynamics of Dimensional Reduction". Physics Letters B. 97 (2): 233. Bibcode:1980PhLB...97..233F. doi:10.1016/0370-2693(80)90590-0.
- Freund, P.G.O. (1982). "Kaluza-Klein Cosmologies". Nuclear Physics B. 209 (1): 146–156. Bibcode:1982NuPhB.209..146F. doi:10.1016/0550-3213(82)90106-7.
- Freund, P.G.O. (1985). "Superstrings from Twenty-six-Dimensions?". Physics Letters B. 151 (5–6): 387–390. Bibcode:1985PhLB..151..387F. doi:10.1016/0370-2693(85)91660-0.
- Freund, P.G.O.; Brekke L.; Olson M.; Witten E. (1988). "Nonarchimedean String Dynamics". Nuclear Physics B. 302 (3): 365–402. Bibcode:1988NuPhB.302..365B. doi:10.1016/0550-3213(88)90207-6.
- Chicago Tribune
