= Pran Nath (physicist) =

American physicist (born 1939)

- Born: 1939 (age 86–87); Harappa, Punjab, British India
- Citizenship: USA
- Education: University of Delhi (1958), Stanford University (1964)
- Known for: Supergravity
- Awards: Alexander von Humboldt Prize
- Scientific career
- Fields: Particle physics
- Workplaces: Northeastern University
- Doctoral advisor: Gordon L. Shaw

Pran Nath is a theoretical physicist working at Northeastern University, with research focus in elementary particle physics. He holds a Matthews Distinguished University Professor chair.

== Research ==
His main area of research is in the fields of supergravity and particle physics beyond the standard model. He is one of the originators of the first supergravity theory in 1975. In 1982 in collaboration with Richard Arnowitt and Ali Hani Chamseddine, he developed the field of Applied Supergravity and the supergravity grand unification popularly known as SUGRA or mSUGRA model for gravity mediated breaking of supersymmetry. SUGRA models, and specifically mSUGRA, are currently the leading candidates for discovery at the Fermilab Tevatron and at the CERN Large Hadron Collider (LHC). He has contributed to further development of the field through studies of CP violation, predictions on muon anomalous moment gμ − 2 ahead of experiment, supersymmetric dark matter, discovery of the hyperbolic branch of radiative breaking of the electroweak symmetry, and detection of supersymmetric signal at colliders via the so-called tri-leptonic signal. He has also made contribution to studies on stability of the proton in unified models. His early work concerns the invention of effective Lagrangian method, the first current algebra analysis of pion-pion scattering and solution to the notorious U(1) problem. His recent work has focused SO(10) grand unification, and on the Stueckelberg extensions of the Standard Model. In 1999 he was awarded the Alexander von Humboldt Prize for "basic contributions in supersymmetry and supergravity".

== Life and career ==
He was born in West Punjab, British India in 1939, and is of Kashmiri descent. He received his bachelor's degree in Science at the University of Delhi in 1958, and his Ph.D. degree from Stanford University in 1964. He taught at the University of California, Riverside (1964–65) and was Andrew Mellon Fellow at the University of Pittsburgh (1965–66). Since 1966 he has been at Northeastern University. He has held visiting positions at TIFR, Mumbai under the United Nations Development Program, at the University of California, Santa Barbara, at Bonn, CERN, Heidelberg and Munich. He was co-chair of the conference "Gauge Theories and Modern Field Theory", in 1975, and founding chair in 1990 of the annual PASCOS symposium (Particle physics, String theory and Cosmology), and also the founding chair in 1993 of the annual conference SUSY. In 2004 PASCOS symposium held a special Pran Nath Festschrift honouring his "pioneering contributions over four decades in the fields of high energy theory, supersymmetry, supergravity, and unification". A full list of his publications can be seen here International conference SUGRA20. An international conference was held at Northeastern University March 17–20, 2003 celebrating 20 years since the invention of SUGRA unified model of which he was a co-author.

== Publications ==
- Proton stability in grand unified theories, in strings and in branes, Pran Nath, Pavel Fileviez Pérez. Published in Physics Reports 441:191–317, 2007. Online
