= Simons Center for Geometry and Physics =

Research facility

Coordinates: 40.91588°N 73.12691°W

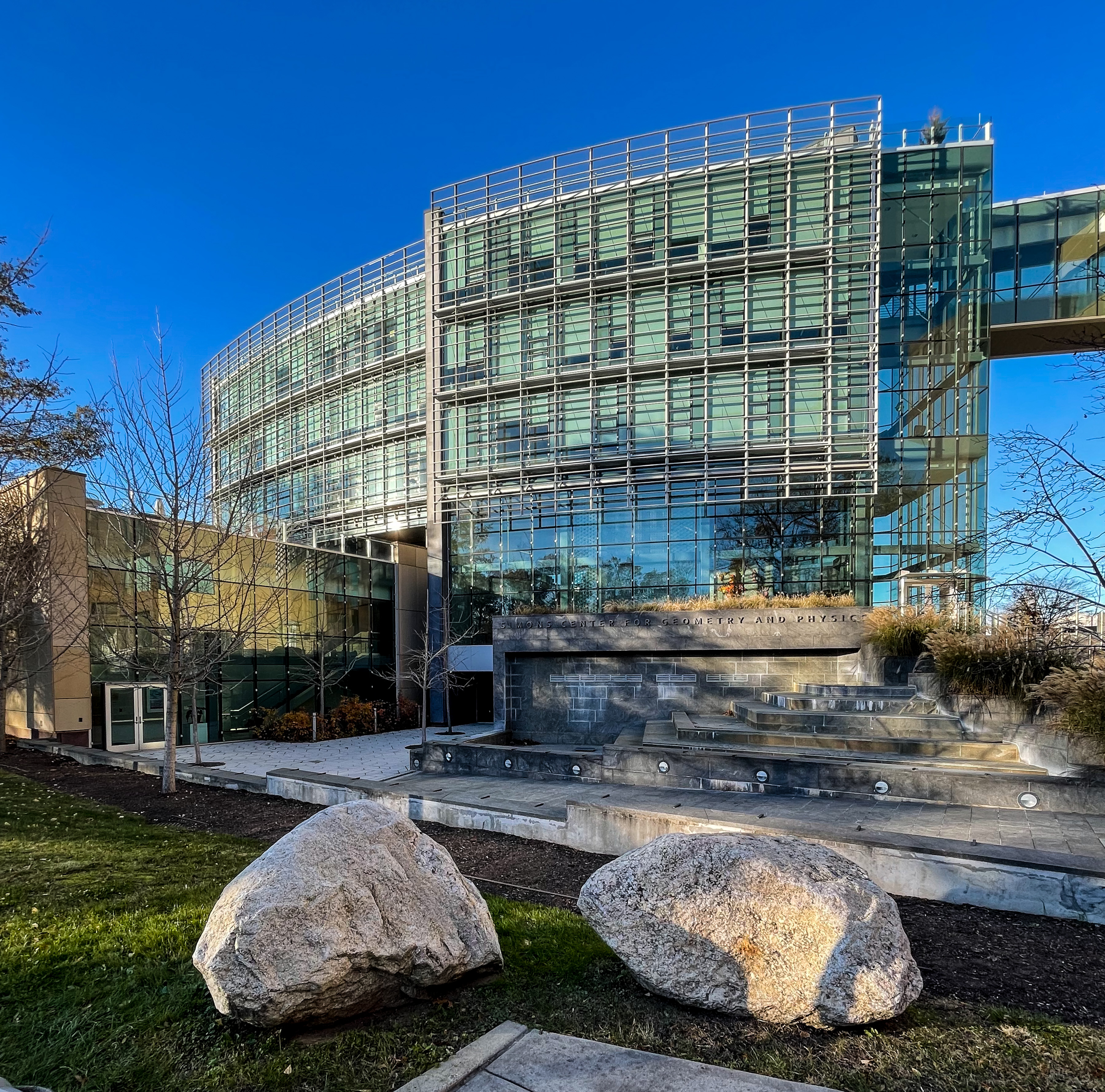

General information
- Location: 100 Nicolls Road; Stony Brook, NY 11790
- Construction started: Spring 2009
- Opened: November 2010
- Cost: $30 million

Technical details
- Floor count: 6
- Floor area: 40,000 sq ft

The Simons Center for Geometry and Physics is a center for theoretical physics and mathematics at Stony Brook University in New York. The focus of the center is mathematical physics and the interface of geometry and physics. It was founded in 2007 by a gift from the James and Marilyn Simons Foundation. The center's current director is algebraic geometer Ludmil Katzarkov.

== History ==
=== Background ===
James H. Simons was the chair of the mathematics department at Stony Brook from 1968 to 1976. After deciding to leave academia, he then went on to make billions with his investment firm Renaissance Technologies. On February 27, 2008 he announced a donation totaling $60 million (including a $25 million gift two years prior) to the mathematics and physics departments. This was the largest single gift ever given to any of the SUNY schools. The gift came during Stony Brook's 50th anniversary and shortly after Gov. Spitzer announced his commitment to make Stony Brook a “flagship” of the SUNY system that would rival the nation’s most prestigious state research universities. During his announcement speech, Jim Simons said, "From Archimedes to Newton to Einstein, much of the most profound work in physics has been deeply intertwined with the geometric side of mathematics. Since then, in particular with the advent of such areas as quantum field theory and string theory, developments in geometry and physics have become if anything more interrelated. The new Center will give many of the world's best mathematicians and physicists the opportunity to work and interact in an environment and an architecture carefully designed to enhance progress. We believe there is a chance that work accomplished at the Center will significantly change and deepen our understanding of the physical universe and of its basic mathematical structure." The Center results from extensive thought and planning between faculty, department chairs, and others, including Cumrun Vafa of Harvard, who directs the Simons Foundation-supported summer institutes on string theory at Stony Brook, and Isadore Singer of MIT.

=== Establishment ===
John Morgan served as the founding director from 2009 to 2016. Luis Álvarez-Gaumé was director from 2016 to 2026. Ludmil Katzarkov took over as director in Fall 2026.

== Building ==
The Simons Center's building was completed in September 2010. The building is adjacent to the physics and mathematics departments to allow for close collaboration with the mathematics department and the C. N. Yang Institute for Theoretical Physics. The building offers 40,000 square feet (3,700 m^{2}) of floor space, spread over six stories, and includes a 236-seat auditorium, a 90-seat lecture hall, offices, seminar rooms, and a cafe. The building is LEED Gold certified and is connected to the Math Tower via an elevated walkway.

== Faculty ==
The Center's permanent faculty currently consists of mathematicians Simon Donaldson, Kenji Fukaya, and John Pardon, and physicists Nikita Nekrasov and Zohar Komargodski. The Center's academic staff also includes roughly 10 research assistant professors and 20 visiting researchers at any given time. Other former faculty members include physicists Michael R. Douglas and Anton Kapustin.

== See also ==
- Institute for Theoretical Physics (disambiguation)
- Center for Theoretical Physics (disambiguation)
