= Double copy theory =

Theory for scattering amplitudes in perturbative quantum gravity

Double copy theory is a theory in theoretical physics, specifically in quantum gravity, that hypothesizes a perturbative duality between gauge theory and gravity. The theory says that scattering amplitudes in non-Abelian gauge theories can be factorized such that replacement of the color factor by additional kinematic dependence factor, in a well-defined way, automatically leads to gravity scattering amplitudes. It was first written down by Zvi Bern, John Joseph Carrasco and Henrik Johansson in 2010 and was sometimes known as the BCJ duality after its creators or as "gravity = gauge × gauge".

The theory can be used to make calculations of gravity scattering amplitudes simpler by instead calculating the Yang–Mills amplitude and following the double copy prescription. This technique has been used, for example, to calculate the shape of gravitational waves emitted by two merging black hole. This was proven to work at tree level and at higher orders, including at fourth post-Minkowskian order. The theory has been applied to black holes.

== See also ==
- Duality
- Yang–Mills theory
- N = 8 supergravity
