= Ali Chamseddine =

Lebanese physicist (born 1953)

- Born: Ali Hani Chamseddine; 20 February 1953 (age 73); Joun, Lebanon
- Education: Imperial College London
- Known for: mSUGRA; Noncommutative geometry
- Awards: Alexander Von Humboldt Research Prize (2001); TWAS Physics Prize (2009); G. Bude Medal, College de France (2007)
- Scientific career
- Fields: Physics
- Workplaces: American University of Beirut, IHÉS
- Doctoral advisor: Abdus Salam

Ali Hani Chamseddine (Arabic: علي شمس الدين, born 20 February 1953) is a Lebanese physicist known for his contributions to particle physics, general relativity and mathematical physics. As of 2013, Chamseddine is a theoretical physics Professor at the American University of Beirut and the Institut des hautes études scientifiques.

== Education and working positions ==
Ali H. Chamseddine was born in 1953 in the town of Joun, Lebanon. He received his BSc in physics from the Lebanese University in July 1973. After receiving a scholarship from the Lebanese University to continue his graduate studies in physics at Imperial College London, Chamseddine received a Diploma in Physics in June 1974, under the supervision of Tom Kibble. After that, Chamseddine did his PhD in Theoretical Physics at Imperial College London as well, in September 1976, where he studied under supervision of Nobel laureate Abdus Salam. Later on, Chamseddine did his post-doctoral studies at the Abdus Salam International Centre for Theoretical Physics (ICTP), and then continued his scientific career at universities including American University of Beirut, CERN, Northeastern University, ETH Zurich, and University of Zurich.

== Scientific achievements ==
Chamseddine's groundbreaking work has significantly impacted the fields of particle physics, general relativity, and mathematical physics. His career is marked by influential works in supergravity, Grand Unified Theory, noncommutative geometry and cosmology. Chamseddine also lead the development of theories with tangible, testable predictions that directly influence experimental searches for new frontiers in physics.

=== Supergravity works ===
Chamseddine's early research, notably his 1976 Ph.D. thesis and subsequent collaborations with Peter West, was instrumental in establishing supergravity as a gauge theory of supersymmetry. They developed and applied the 1.5 order formalism, an elegant fiber bundle formulation. This framework proved crucial for the consistent mathematical formulation of supergravity, demonstrating the invariance of these theories under local supersymmetry to all orders – a fundamental requirement for a viable theory of quantum gravity. This foundational work laid the essential groundwork for the field of supergravity.

In 1980, while at CERN, Chamseddine made the significant discovery of ten-dimensional supergravity. He extensively explored its compactifications and symmetries in four dimensions. This higher-dimensional supergravity theory later proved to be the low-energy limit of the heterotic superstring, thus establishing a crucial link between his work and string theory. He also played a key role in coupling ten-dimensional supergravity to Yang-Mills matter and discovered the dual formulation of N=1 supergravity in ten dimensions.

In 1982, in a seminal collaboration with Richard Arnowitt and Pran Nath, Ali Chamseddine co-developed mSUGRA (Minimal Supergravity Grand Unification). This model provides a locally supersymmetric framework that elegantly unifies gravity with the three fundamental forces of nature. mSUGRA swiftly became one of the most extensively studied and phenomenologically constrained models for physics beyond the Standard Model.

mSUGRA offers specific predictions for the masses and interactions of supersymmetric particles (sparticles), such as squarks, gluinos, and neutralinos. These predictions have directly guided experimental searches at the Large Hadron Collider (LHC) by both the ATLAS and CMS collaborations. While direct sparticle discoveries remain elusive, the LHC's stringent limits on their masses continue to constrain the mSUGRA parameter space. Furthermore, mSUGRA naturally predicted the existence of a relatively light Higgs boson, consistent with the 125 GeV Higgs discovered at the LHC. Crucially, the model also naturally incorporates a stable Lightest Supersymmetric Particle (LSP), often the neutralino, as a leading candidate WIMP (Weakly Interacting Massive Particle) dark matter, thereby informing numerous direct and indirect dark matter detection experiments globally.

=== Noncommutative geometry and quantum gravity ===
Chamseddine is a leading figure in applying noncommutative geometry as a framework for constructing a quantum theory of gravity. In 1993, collaborating with Jürg Fröhlich and Giovanni Felder, he developed essential structures (metric, connection, curvature) for Riemannian noncommutative geometry, demonstrating its application to a two-sheeted space.

This principle posits that the dynamics of spacetime and matter are entirely encoded in the spectrum of a generalized Dirac operator. The SAP allows for the derivation of the full Standard Model Lagrangian, including all its fundamental fields (fermions, gauge bosons, Higgs boson), and predicts specific relations between its parameters at the unification scale. For example, the Higgs boson naturally emerges as a fluctuation of the noncommutative spacetime itself. This unified description of gravity and the Standard Model implies specific relationships between seemingly disparate physical phenomena and offers theoretical guidance for the search for new physics beyond the Standard Model.

Another interesting aspect of Chamseddine and Connes' work is the establishment of a bridge between noncommutative geometry and quantum gravity. At its heart, noncommutative geometry (NCG) generalizes ordinary geometry by allowing the algebra of functions on space to be noncommutative — like operators in quantum mechanics. Connes and Chamseddine’s collaboration proved three important results. First, spacetime itself could have an underlying noncommutative structure. Second, the Standard Model + Gravity can emerge naturally from the spectral data of a spectral triple. Finally, the SAP ties this all together with a single unified action.

This directly addresses two key problems: First, why gravity and quantum matter have different mathematical descriptions in standard physics. Second, how to unify them without inventing huge new structures (like strings) but by extending the notion of geometry itself. In a Nutshell, Chamseddine and Connes bridge noncommutative geometry with quantum gravity by:

1. Replacing the manifold with spectral data.
2. Making both gravity and the Standard Model emerge from one geometric principle.
3. Providing a new angle on the idea that spacetime at Planck scale may not be continuous.
4. Offering a mathematically rigorous candidate for unifying geometry, quantum mechanics, and fundamental interactions.

=== Mimetic dark matter ===
In 2013–2014, Ali Chamseddine and Viatcheslav Mukhanov proposed a novel idea now known as mimetic gravity. The core idea is surprisingly simple: start with standard General Relativity then rewrite the metric in a special way so that its conformal degree of freedom becomes an independent scalar field. This extra scalar mode behaves dynamically like pressureless dust, i.e., cold dark matter, without introducing new particles.

Mimetic gravity provides an alternative to particle dark matter, as the latter's effect arises purely from a modified gravitational sector. This is conceptually radical because it shows how “dark matter” could be geometry in disguise. Unlike some modified gravity theories, the mimetic scenario does not require extra exotic fields or couplings.

It predicts new cosmological signatures that can be compared with structure formation and cosmic microwave background (CMB) observations. This concept has been later generalized by Chamseddine and Mukhanov to describe mimetic inflation, non-singular bounces and mimetic dark energy.

=== Topological gravity ===
Chamseddine has also made notable contributions to topological gravity and related areas. In the 1980s and 1990s, Chamseddine worked on formulations of gravity as a topological field theory, particularly inspired by the successes of Chern–Simons theories in lower-dimensional gravity. He also studied extensions of gravity actions that include topological terms like the Pontryagin, Euler, and Chern-Simons invariants. These terms do not affect local dynamics but contribute to global, topological features of spacetime, influencing aspects like anomalies and black hole entropy.
