= Richard Arnowitt =

American physicist (1928–2014)

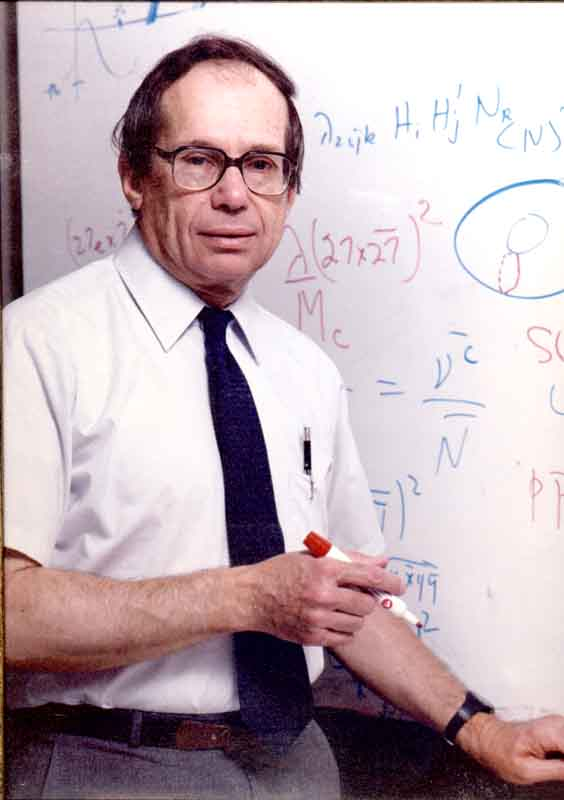
- Born: May 3, 1928; New York City, New York, United States
- Died: June 12, 2014 (aged 86)
- Education: Rensselaer Polytechnic Institute (BS, MS) Harvard University (Ph.D. in physics 1953)
- Known for: Supergravity; ADM formalism
- Awards: Guggenheim Fellow (75-6), Dannie Heineman Prize (94)
- Scientific career
- Fields: Theoretical physics
- Workplaces: Northeastern University; Texas A&M University

Richard Lewis Arnowitt (May 3, 1928 – June 12, 2014) was an American physicist known for his contributions to theoretical particle physics and to general relativity.

Arnowitt was a Distinguished Professor (Emeritus) at Texas A&M University, where he was a member of the Department of Physics.

His research interests were centered on supersymmetry and supergravity, from phenomenology (namely how to find evidence for supersymmetry at current and planned particle accelerators or in the guise of dark matter) to more theoretical questions of string and M theory.

In the context of general relativity, he was best known for his development (with Stanley Deser and Charles Misner) of the ADM formalism, roughly speaking a way of describing spacetime as space evolving in time, which allows a recasting of Einstein's theory in terms of a more general formalism used in physics to describe dynamical systems, namely the Hamiltonian formalism. In the framework of that formalism, there is also a straightforward way to globally define quantities like energy or, equivalently, mass (so-called ADM mass/energy) which, in general relativity, is not trivial at all.

Arnowitt was also known for his work (with Ali Chamseddine and Pran Nath) which developed the theory of supergravity grand unification (with gravity mediated breaking). This work allowed for the unification of the three forces of microscopic physics at a very high mass scale (a result subsequently indirectly verified at the CERN LEP accelerator). The simplest version, called mSUGRA, is now commonly used to search for new physics at high energy accelerators. In addition, Arnowitt's work (with Marvin Girardeau) on many body theory of liquid Helium has stimulated many applications in that field.
