= M5-brane =

Black brane solution in eleven-dimensional supergravity

In theoretical physics, an M5-brane is a fundamental brane of M-theory. As such, it can be described explicitly as a black brane solution to eleven-dimensional supergravity, the low-energy limit of M-theory. In particular, it carries a magnetic charge under the 3-form gauge field of the 11-dimensional supergravity multiplet. The M5-brane is the electric-magnetic dual of the M2-brane.

Upon compactification, the M5-brane becomes either the D4-brane or the NS5-brane of type IIA supergravity, depending on whether the 11-dimensional theory is reduced along a direction parallel or orthogonal to the M5-brane, respectively.

The worldvolume theory on a stack of M5-branes at low energies is the six-dimensional N=(2,0) superconformal field theory (SCFT) with gauge algebra of the A-type. Other gauge algebras can be realised by placing the stack of branes on a singularity.

The PST model provides a Green-Schwarz description of the worldvolume physics of a single M5-brane. On the other hand, direct knowledge of the non-Abelian case, for instance via a Lagrangian description, is not presently available, due to various technical difficulties. Since superconformal symmetry is only available in 6 or lower spacetime dimensions, this maximally supersymmetric theory may be used to derive an infinite number of other theories. Furthermore, via the AdS/CFT correspondence, the M5-brane worldvolume theory can be used to study M-theory on asymptotically Anti-de Sitter (AdS) spacetimes.

Despite the lack of a Lagrangian formulation, brane constructions provide evidence that the M5-brane worldvolume theory can support four- and two-codimensional solitonic excitations, namely self-dual strings and three-branes.
