= Luis Álvarez-Gaumé =

Spanish theoretical physicist (born 1955)

- Born: Madrid, Spain
- Education: Stony Brook University
- Known for: Gravitational anomalies String theory
- Scientific career
- Fields: Theoretical physics
- Doctoral advisor: Daniel Z. Freedman

Luis Álvarez-Gaumé (born 1955) is a Spanish theoretical physicist who works on string theory and quantum gravity.

Luis Álvarez-Gaumé obtained his PhD in 1981 from Stony Brook University and worked from 1981 to 1984 at Harvard University as a Junior Fellow, before he moved to Boston University to work as a professor. From 1986 until 2016, Álvarez-Gaumé was a permanent member of the CERN Theoretical Physics unit. In 2016, he became the director of the Simons Center for Geometry and Physics at Stony Brook.

In the 1980s, Álvarez-Gaumé had various important contributions to the field of string theory and its mathematical framework. Together with Edward Witten he showed in 1983 that quantum field theories generally have gravitational anomalies. Shortly after this, Michael Green and John Schwarz showed that such anomalies are avoided in various realizations of superstring theory. Álvarez-Gaumé is also known for a physical proof of the Atiyah–Singer theorem using supersymmetry. His work spans a range of different subjects, including string perturbation theory at higher orders, quantum field theories on Riemann surfaces, quantum groups, as well as dualities in string theory and black holes in string theory. In the 1990s, Álvarez-Gaumé studied supersymmetry breaking at low energies (in N = 2 SUSY gauge theories). He has also co-authored a textbook on quantum field theory.
