= Pure 4D N = 1 supergravity =

Minimal supergravity in four dimensions

In supersymmetry, pure 4D $\mathcal N=1$ supergravity describes the simplest four-dimensional supergravity, with a single supercharge and a supermultiplet containing a graviton and gravitino. The action consists of the Einstein–Hilbert action and the Rarita–Schwinger action. The theory was first formulated by Daniel Z. Freedman, Peter van Nieuwenhuizen, and Sergio Ferrara, and independently by Stanley Deser and Bruno Zumino in 1976. The only consistent extension to spacetimes with a cosmological constant is to anti-de Sitter space, first formulated by Paul Townsend in 1977. When additional matter supermultiplets are included in this theory, the result is known as matter-coupled 4D $\mathcal N = 1$ supergravity.

== Flat spacetime ==
To describe the coupling between gravity and particles of arbitrary spin, it is useful to use the vielbein formalism of general relativity. This replaces the metric by a set of vector fields $e_a = e^\mu_a \partial_\mu$ indexed by flat indices $a$ such that

$$g_{\mu\nu} = e^a_\mu e^b_\nu \eta_{ab}.$$

In a sense the vielbeins are the square root of the metric. This introduces a new local Lorentz symmetry on the vielbeins $e^a_\mu \rightarrow e^b_\mu \Lambda^a{}_b(x)$, together with the usual diffeomorphism invariance associated with the spacetime indices $\mu$. This has an associated connection known as the spin connection $\omega^{ab}_\mu$ defined through $\nabla_\mu e_a = \omega_\mu{}^{b}{}_a e_b$, it being a generalization of the Christoffel connection to arbitrary spin fields. For example, for spinors the covariant derivative is given by

$$D_\mu = \partial_\mu + \frac{1}{4}\omega_\mu^{ab}\gamma_{ab},$$

where $\gamma_a$ are gamma matrices satisfing the Dirac algebra, with $\gamma_{ab} = \gamma_{[a}\gamma_{b]}$. These are often contracted with vielbeins to construct $\gamma_\mu = e^a_\mu \gamma_a$ which are in general position-dependent fields rather than constants. The spin connection has an explicit expression in terms of the vielbein and an additional torsion tensor which can arise when there is matter present in the theory. A vanishing torsion is equivalent to the Levi-Civita connection.

The pure $\mathcal N=1$ supergravity action in four dimensions is the combination of the Einstein–Hilbert action and the Rarita–Schwinger action

Pure 4D N=1 supergravity action

$S =\frac{M_P^2}{2} \int d^4 x \ e R -\frac{M_P^2}{2} \int d^4 x \ e \ \bar \psi_\mu \gamma^{\mu\nu\rho}D_\nu \psi_\rho.$

Here $M_P$ is the Planck mass, $e = \det e^a_\mu=\sqrt{-g}$, and $\psi_\mu$ is the Majorana gravitino with its spinor index left implicit. Treating this action within the first-order formalism where both the vielbein and spin connection are independent fields allows one to solve for the spin connections equation of motion, showing that it has the torsion $T^\mu_{ab} = \tfrac{1}{2}\bar \psi_a\gamma^\mu \psi_b$. The second-order formalism action is then acquired by substituting this expression for the spin connection back into the action, yielding additional quartic gravitino vertices, with the Einstein–Hilbert and Rarita–Schwinger actions now being written with a torsionless spin connection that explicitly depends on the vielbeins.

The supersymmetry transformation rules that leave the action invariant are

$$\delta e^a_\mu = \tfrac{1}{2}\bar \epsilon \gamma^a \psi_\mu, \ \ \ \ \ \ \ \ \delta \psi_\mu = D_\mu \epsilon,$$

where $\epsilon(x)$ is the spinorial gauge parameter. While historically the first order and second order formalism were the first ones used to show the invariance of the action, the 1.5-order formalism is the easiest for most supergravity calculations. The additional symmetries of the action are general coordinate transformations and local Lorentz transformations.

== Curved spacetime ==
The four dimensional $\mathcal N=1$ super-Poincaré algebra in Minkowski spacetime can be generalized to anti-de Sitter spacetime, but not to de Sitter spacetime, since the super-Jacobi identity cannot be satisfied in that case. Its action can be constructed by gauging this superalgebra, yielding the supersymmetry transformation rules for the vielbein and the gravitino.

The action for $\mathcal N=1$ AdS supergravity in four dimensions is

$$S = \frac{M_P^2}{2} \int d^4 x \ e \bigg(R+ \frac{6}{L^2}\bigg) - \frac{M_P^2}{2}\int d^4 x \ e \bigg(\bar \psi_\mu \gamma^{\mu \nu \rho}D_\nu \psi_\rho + \frac{1}{L}\bar \psi_\mu \gamma^{\mu\nu} \psi_\nu\bigg),$$

where $L$ is the AdS radius and the second term is the negative cosmological constant $\Lambda = -3/L^2$. The supersymmetry transformations are

$$\delta e^a_\mu = \tfrac{1}{2}\bar \epsilon \gamma^a \psi_\mu, \ \ \ \ \ \ \delta \psi_\mu =  D_\mu \epsilon - \tfrac{1}{2L} \gamma_\mu \epsilon.$$

While the bilinear term in the action appears to be giving a mass to the gravitino, it still belongs to the massless gravity supermultiplet. This is because mass is not well-defined in curved spacetimes, with $P_\mu P^\mu$ no longer being a Casimir operator of the AdS super-Poinacre algebra. It is however conventional to define a mass through the Laplace–Beltrami operator, in which case particles within the same supermultiplet have different masses, unlike in flat spacetimes.

== See also ==
- N = 8 supergravity
