= N = 8 supergravity =

Four dimensional supergravity theory

In four spacetime dimensions, N = 8 supergravity is a quantum field theory which involves gravity and a finite number of fields. It can be found from a dimensional reduction of eleven-dimensional supergravity by making the size of seven of the dimensions go to zero. It has eight supersymmetries, which is the most any gravitational theory can have, since there are eight half-steps between spin 2 and spin −2. (The spin 2 graviton is the particle with the highest spin in this theory.) More supersymmetries would mean the particles would have superpartners with spins higher than 2. The only theories with spins higher than 2 which are consistent involve an infinite number of particles (such as string theory and higher-spin theories). Stephen Hawking in his Brief History of Time speculated that this theory could be the theory of everything. However, in later years this was abandoned in favour of string theory. There has been renewed interest in the 21st century, with the possibility that this theory may be finite.

== History ==
By 1976, Murray Gell-Mann had worked many consequences of supersymmetry. He considered an N = 8 theory that could also allow an SO(8) gauge symmetry. A gauged N = 8 supergravity theory from Gell-Mann was then constructed by Bernard de Wit and Hermann Nicolai.

In 1978, Eugène Cremmer and Bernard Julia derived N=8 supergravity from via a circle Kaluza–Klein reduction, which was later connected to eleven-dimensional supergravity.

Stephen Hawking in a lecture in 1981 considered that N=8 indicated that the "end of physics" was in sight. At the end of the 1980s N=8 supergravity was quickly abandoned for other unification theories. David Gross summarized the situation by saying that "N = 8 supergravity is not a very interesting theory."

== Calculations ==
It has been found recently that the expansion of N = 8 supergravity in terms of Feynman diagrams has shown that N = 8 supergravity is in some ways a product of two N = 4 super Yang–Mills theories. This is written schematically as:

N = 8 supergravity = (N = 4 super Yang–Mills) × (N = 4 super Yang–Mills)

This is not surprising, as N = 8 supergravity contains six independent representations of N = 4 super Yang–Mills.

== Particle content ==
The theory contains 1 graviton (spin 2), 8 gravitinos (spin 3/2), 28 vector bosons (spin 1), 56 fermions (spin 1/2), 70 scalar fields (spin 0) where we do not distinguish particles with negative spin. These numbers are simple combinatorial numbers that come from Pascal's triangle and also the number of ways of writing n as a sum of 8 nonnegative cubes A173681.

One reason why the theory was abandoned was that the 28 vector bosons which form an O(8) gauge group is too small to contain the Standard Model U(1) x SU(2) x SU(3) gauge group, which can only fit within the orthogonal group O(10).

For model building, it has been assumed that almost all the supersymmetries would be broken in nature, leaving just one supersymmetry (N = 1), although nowadays because of the lack of evidence for N = 1 supersymmetry higher supersymmetries are now being considered such as N = 2.

== Connection with superstring theory ==
N = 8 supergravity can be viewed as the low-energy approximation of the type IIA or type IIB superstring with 6 of its dimensions compactified on a 6-torus. Equivalently, it may also be viewed as 11D M-theory with seven of its dimensions compactified on a 7-torus or 7-sphere.

== See also ==
- Pure 4D N = 1 supergravity
- Double copy theory
