= Freund–Rubin compactification =

Form of dimensional reduction

Freund–Rubin compactification is a form of dimensional reduction in which a field theory in d-dimensional spacetime, containing gravity and some field whose field strength $F$ is a rank s antisymmetric tensor, 'prefers' to be reduced down to a spacetime with a dimension of either s or d-s.

== Derivation ==
Consider general relativity in d spacetime dimensions. In the presence of an antisymmetric tensor field (without external sources), the Einstein field equations, and the equations of motion for the antisymmetric tensor are

$$\begin{align}
R^{\mu \nu}-\frac{1}{2}R g^{\mu \nu} = 8 \pi T^{\mu \nu}, ~~~~\nabla_\mu F^{\mu \, \alpha_2 ... \alpha_s} = 0
\end{align}$$

Where the stress–energy tensor takes the form

$$T^{\mu \nu} = F_{\alpha_1 ... \alpha_{s-1}}~^\mu F^{\alpha_1 ... \alpha_{s-1} \nu}-\frac{1}{2s} F_{\alpha_1 ... \alpha_{s}} F^{\alpha_1 ... \alpha_{s}}g^{\mu \nu}$$

Being a rank s antisymmetric tensor, the field strength $F$ has a natural ansatz for its solution, proportional to the Levi-Civita tensor on some s-dimensional manifold.

$$F^{\mu_1 ... \mu_{s}}=(\epsilon^{\mu_1 ... \mu_{s}}/\sqrt{g_s})  f$$

Here, the indices $\mu_i$ run over s of the dimensions of the ambient d-dimensional spacetime, $g_s$ is the determinant of the metric of this s-dimensional subspace, and $f$ is some constant with dimensions of mass-squared (in natural units).

Since the field strength is nonzero only on an s-dimensional submanifold, the metric $g$ is naturally separated into two parts, of block-diagonal form

$$g_{\mu \nu}=\begin{bmatrix}
g_{ m n}(x^p) & 0 \\
0 & g_{\bar{m} \bar{n}}(x^{\bar{p}})
\end{bmatrix}$$

with $m$, $n$, and $p$ extending over the same s dimensions as the field strength $F$, and $\bar{m}$, $\bar{n}$, and $\bar{p}$ covering the remaining d-s dimensions. Having separated our d dimensional space into the product of two subspaces, Einstein's field equations allow us to solve for the curvature of these two sub-manifolds, and we find

$$\begin{align}
R_{d-s} &= \frac{(s-1)(d-s)}{(d-2)}\lambda, ~ ~ R_{s}=-\frac{s(d-s-1)}{(d-2)}\lambda \\
\lambda &= 8 \pi G \sgn(g_s) f^2
\end{align}$$

We find that the Ricci curvatures of the s- and (d-s)-dimensional sub-manifolds are necessarily opposite in sign. One must have positive curvature, and the other must have negative curvature, and so one of these manifolds must be compact. Consequently, at scales significantly larger than that of the compact manifold, the universe appears to have either s or (d-s) dimensions, as opposed to the underlying d.

As an important example of this, eleven dimensional supergravity contains a 3-form antisymmetric tensor with a 4-form field strength, and consequently prefers to compactify 7 or 4 of its space-like dimensions, so the large-scale spacetime must be either 4 or 7 dimensional, the former of which is attractive from a phenomenological perspective

== Perspective from string theory ==
Some important examples of Freund–Rubin compactification come from looking at the behavior of branes in string theory. Similar to the way that coupling to the electromagnetic field stabilizes electrically charged particles, the presence of antisymmetric tensor fields of various rank in a string theory stabilizes branes of various dimensions. In turn, the geometry of the spacetime near stacks of branes becomes warped in such a way that Freund–Rubin compactification is realized. In Type IIB string theory, which requires ten spacetime dimensions, there is a five-form field strength $F_5$ that allows for three dimensional D-branes, and the near horizon geometry of a stack of D3-branes is five-dimensional anti-de Sitter space times a five-dimensional sphere, $AdS_5 \times S^5$, which is compact in five dimensions. This geometry is an important part of the AdS/CFT correspondence.

Similarly, M-theory and its low energy limit of eleven dimensional supergravity contain a 4-form field strength, that stabilizes M2 and M5 branes. The near horizon geometry of stacks of these branes are $AdS_4 \times S^7$ and $AdS_7 \times S^4$, respectively.
