= M2-brane =

Brane in eleven-dimensional supergravity

In theoretical physics, an M2-brane, is a spatially extended mathematical object (brane) that appears in string theory and in related theories (e.g. M-theory, F-theory). In particular, it is a solution of eleven-dimensional supergravity which possesses a three-dimensional world volume.

== Description ==
The M2-brane solution can be found by requiring $(Poincare)_{3}\times SO(8)$ symmetry of the solution and solving the supergravity equations of motion with the p-brane ansatz. The solution is given by a metric and three-form gauge field which, in isotropic coordinates, can be written as

$$\begin{align} ds^{2}_{M2} &= \left(1+\frac{q}{r^{6}}\right)^{-\frac{2}{3}}dx^{\mu} dx^{\nu}\eta_{\mu\nu} + \left(1+\frac{q}{r^{6}}\right)^{\frac{1}{3}}dx^{i}dx^{j}\delta_{ij} \\
F_{i\mu_{1}\mu_{2}\mu_{3}} &= \epsilon_{\mu_{1}\mu_{2}\mu_{3}} \partial_{i}\left(1+\frac{q}{r^6}\right)^{-1}, \quad \mu=1,\ldots ,3 \quad i=4,\ldots , 11,\end{align}$$

where $\eta$ is the flat-space metric and the distinction has been made between world volume $x^\mu$ and transverse $x^i$ coordinates. The constant $q$ is proportional to the charge of the brane which is given by the integral of $F$ over the boundary of the transverse space of the brane.

== See also ==
- String theory
- Membrane (M-theory)
- M-theory
