= Peter van Nieuwenhuizen =

Dutch theoretical physicist (born 1938)

- Born: 26 October 1938 (age 87); Utrecht, Netherlands
- Education: University of Utrecht
- Known for: Pure 4D N = 1 supergravity
- Awards: Dirac Prize (1993); Dannie Heineman Prize (2006); Breakthrough Prize in Fundamental Physics (2019)
- Scientific career
- Fields: Physics
- Workplaces: Stony Brook University
- Doctoral advisor: Martinus Veltman
- Doctoral students: Horațiu Năstase; Shoucheng Zhang

Peter van Nieuwenhuizen (Dutch: [ˈpeːtər vɑ ˈniu.ə(n)ˌɦœyzə(n)]; born 26 October 1938) is a Dutch theoretical physicist. He is a distinguished Professor at Stony Brook University in the United States. Van Nieuwenhuizen is widely known for his contributions to string theory, supersymmetry, supergravity and field theory.

He is best known for his discovery of supergravity with Sergio Ferrara and Daniel Z. Freedman, for which he along with his collaborators won the Breakthrough Prize in Fundamental Physics in 2019.

== Life and career ==
Peter van Nieuwenhuizen studied physics and mathematics at the University of Utrecht, where he obtained in 1971 his Ph.D. under the supervision of later Nobel laureate Martinus Veltman.

After his studies in Utrecht, Van Nieuwenhuizen went to CERN (Geneva), the University of Paris in Orsay, and Brandeis University (Waltham). In 1975 he joined the Institute for Theoretical Physics, now named C. N. Yang Institute for Theoretical Physics, of the Stony Brook University, where he succeeded Nobel laureate C. N. Yang as its director from 1999 until 2002.

He is married to Belgian physicist Marie de Crombrugghe.

== Awards and honors ==
For constructing supergravity, the first supersymmetric extension of Einstein's theory of general relativity, and for their central role in its subsequent development Peter van Nieuwenhuizen, Sergio Ferrara and Daniel Z. Freedman received in 1993 the Dirac medal from the International Centre for Theoretical Physics in Trieste (Italy), in 2006 the Dannie Heineman Prize for Mathematical Physics of the American Physical Society and in 2016 the Ettore Majorana Medal from EMFCSC, Erice. In 2019, the three were awarded a special Breakthrough Prize in Fundamental Physics of $3 million for the discovery.

He is a fellow of the American Physical Society, and a corresponding member of the Royal Netherlands Academy of Arts and Sciences since 1994, and of the Austrian Academy of Sciences. He was made a Knight in the Order of the Dutch Lion in 2004, and Honorary professor of the Technical University of Vienna (Austria) in 2005.
