= Communication physics =

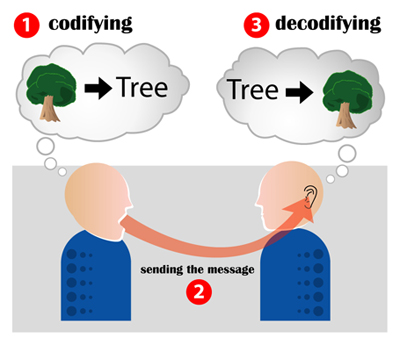
Encoding, sending via a channel, receiving, and decoding are necessary parts of communication.

Communication physics is one of the applied branches of physics. It deals with various kinds of communication systems. These can range from basic ideas such as mobile phone communication to quantum communication via quantum entanglement. Communication physics is also a journal edition created in 2018 published by Nature Research that aims to publish research that involves a different way of thinking in the research field.

== Applications ==
Communication physics aims to study and explain how a communication system works. This can be applied in a hard science way via Computer Communication or in the way of how people communicate.

An example of communication physics is how computers can transmit and receive data through networks. This would also deal with explaining how these devices encode and decode messages.

== See also ==
- Electronic communication
- Optical communication
- Computer communication
- Telephone
- Telegraph
- Radio
- Television
- Mobile phone communication
- Nanoscale network
