= Sergio Ferrara =

Italian physicist (born 1945)

Sergio Ferrara (born 2 May 1945) is an Italian physicist working on theoretical physics of elementary particles and mathematical physics. He is renowned for the discovery of theories introducing supersymmetry as a symmetry of elementary particles (super-Yang–Mills theories, together with Bruno Zumino) and of supergravity, the first significant extension of Einstein's general relativity, based on the principle of "local supersymmetry" (together with Daniel Z. Freedman, and Peter van Nieuwenhuizen). He is an emeritus staff member at CERN and a professor emeritus at the University of California, Los Angeles.

== Career ==
Sergio Ferrara was born on 2 May 1945 in Rome, Italy. He graduated from the University of Rome, obtaining in 1968 the Laurea Degree (the highest Degree that was awarded in Italy at the time). Since then he has worked as a CNEN and INFN researcher at the Frascati National Laboratories; as a CNRS Visiting Scientist at the Laboratoire de Physique Théorique, École Normale Supérieure, Paris, and at the Theory Division at CERN, Geneva. In 1980 he was nominated Full Professor of theoretical physics in Italy. He became a staff member of the Theory Division at CERN in 1981. In 1985, he became a Professor of Physics at the University of California, Los Angeles. Since 1986 he has been a senior staff member of the Physics Department at CERN. During the years 2010-2014 he has been a guest professor at CERN as Principal Investigator of the European Research Council Advanced Grant SUPERFIELDS. He is currently a senior staff member, emeritus, at CERN.

== Conformal field theory ==
In 1971–1975, Sergio Ferrara did pioneering work on conformal field theory and the conformal bootstrap. In a series of papers written in collaboration with Raoul Gatto, Aurelio Grillo and Giorgio Parisi, he studied constraints imposed by conformal symmetry on the operator dimensions, the form of the correlation functions, the operator product expansion, and the conformal partial wave expansion for the four-point correlation functions of the theory. This work, together with the similar work by Alexander Polyakov, laid the foundations of Conformal Field Theory.

== Supersymmetric Yang-Mills theory ==
In 1974, with Bruno Zumino, he formulated supersymmetric gauge theories, which opened the way to building supersymmetric extensions of the Standard Model of particle physics and exploring their consequences. This result was obtained independently by Abdus Salam and James Strathdee.

== Supergravity ==
In 1976, Sergio Ferrara, Daniel Z. Freedman, and Peter van Nieuwenhuizen discovered supergravity at Stony Brook University in New York, specifically by describing pure 4D N = 1 supergravity. It was initially proposed as a four-dimensional theory. The theory of supergravity generalizes Einstein's general theory of relativity by incorporating the principles of supersymmetry. In 1982 Sergio together with E. Cremmer, L. Girardello, and A. Van Proeyen were the first to derived the full action of 4D N = 1 supergravity. In 2019 the three were awarded a special Breakthrough Prize in Fundamental Physics of $3 million for the discovery.

== Black hole attractors ==
In 1995, with Renata Kallosh and Andrew Strominger, he formulated the theory of Black Hole attractors, a dynamical mechanism which determines the Bekenstein–Hawking entropy for extremal black holes in terms of their charges.

== Awards ==
- Prix Scientifique de l'UAP, 1991, Paris.

"For contributions to Conformal Field Theory and to the discovery of Supergravity"

- Dirac Medal, 1993, ICTP, Trieste. (with Daniel Z. Freedman, and Peter van Nieuwenhuizen)

"For their discovery of supergravity theory in 1976 and their major contributions in the subsequent developments of the theory. Their discovery led to an explosion of interest in quantum gravity and it transformed the subject, playing a significant role in very important developments in string theory as well as Kaluza-Klein theory"

- Honorary Laurea in Physics, 2005, from the University of Rome "Tor Vergata".
- Dannie Heineman Prize for Mathematical Physics, 2006, American Physical Society. (with Daniel Z. Freedman, and Peter van Nieuwenhuizen)

"For constructing supergravity, the first supersymmetric extension of Einstein's theory of general relativity, and for their central role in its subsequent development."

- Enrico Fermi Prize, 2005, Società Italiana di Fisica. (with Gabriele Veneziano and Bruno Zumino)

"He honoured Italian physics with his discoveries, substantially contributing to the discoveries leading to the development of modern gravity theories. For his contribution to the discovery of supergravity theory."

- Amaldi medal, 2008, SIGRAV (Italian Society for General Relativity and Gravitational Physics),

"For his relevant contributions to supergravity models, their matter couplings and their implications for black hole physics, such as the attractor mechanism"

- Avogadro Medal (Accademia Nazionale dei Lincei, February 2008)
- Miller visiting professorship award (U.C. Berkeley, Fall 2008)
- ERC Advanced Grant Award ”Superfields”, n.226455 (2008 call)
- Commendatore Ordine al Merito della Repubblica Italiana, 2009.

"For services in Theoretical Physics."

- Margherita Hack Prize for Science (INAF and Italian Ministry of Culture, Spoleto, 2015)
- JINR Medal of Honour (Dubna, 2015)
- Ettore Majorana Medal (EMFCSC, Erice, 2016) (with Daniel Z. Freedman, and Peter van Nieuwenhuizen)
- Foreign Member of the Russian Academy of Sciences (2016)
- Special Breakthrough Prize in Fundamental Physics (with Daniel Z.Freedman and Peter van Nieuwenhuizen), 2019

"For the invention of Supergravity, in which quantum variables are part of the description of the geometry of space time”

- Isaac Pomeranchuk Prize (2020)

"For his contribution to fundamental aspects of supersymmetry that has been a very important achievement for our understanding of modern supergravity theories"
