= Daniel Z. Freedman =

American physicist (b. 1939)

- Born: 1939 (age 86–87); Hartford, Connecticut
- Known for: Pure 4D N = 1 supergravity
- Scientific career
- Fields: Supergravity

Daniel Zissel Freedman (born 1939 in Hartford, Connecticut) is an American theoretical physicist. He is an emeritus Professor of Physics and Applied Mathematics at the Massachusetts Institute of Technology (MIT), and is currently a visiting professor at Stanford University. He is mainly known for his work in supergravity. He is a member of the U. S. National Academy of Sciences.

== Education ==
Daniel Freedman completed his undergraduate degree from Wesleyan University and completed his Ph.D. from the University of Wisconsin–Madison in 1964. In 1967–68, Freedman was a member of the School of Natural Sciences at the Institute for Advanced Study, and returned subsequently in 1973–74 and 1986–87. He was appointed Professor of Applied Mathematics at the Massachusetts Institute of Technology (MIT) in 1980 and joint Professor of Physics in 2001. Before joining MIT, he was a professor at Stony Brook University.

== Supergravity ==
In 1976, Daniel Z. Freedman codiscovered (with Sergio Ferrara and Peter van Nieuwenhuizen) supergravity. Freedman and van Nieuwenhuizen were on the faculty of the Stony Brook University. Supergravity generalizes Einstein's theory of general relativity by incorporating the then-new idea of supersymmetry. In the following decades it had implications for physics beyond the Standard Model, for superstring theory and for mathematics. For his work on supergravity, Freedman, a former Sloan and twice Guggenheim fellow, received in 1993 the Dirac Medal and Prize, in 2006 the Dannie Heineman Prize for Mathematical Physics, in 2016 the Majorana Medal and in 2019 the Breakthrough Prize in Fundamental Physics, in each case together with his codiscoverers Sergio Ferrara and Peter van Nieuwenhuizen. Freedman also gave the 2002 Andrejewski Lectures in Mathematical Physics at the Max Planck Institute for Mathematics in the Sciences in Leipzig.

== Research interests ==
Daniel Freedman is a professor at MIT. His research is in quantum field theory, quantum gravity, and superstring theory with an emphasis on the role of supersymmetry. He is also noted for proposing in 1974 what would become known as Coherent elastic neutrino-nucleus scattering (CEvNS), which was experimentally confirmed in 2017. His most recent area of concentration is the AdS/CFT correspondence in which results on the strong coupling limit of certain 4-dimensional gauge theories can be obtained from calculations in classical 5-dimensional supergravity.

In the academic year 1993/94 Freedman was a visiting scientist in the CERN Theory Division, Geneva, Switzerland.
