= Supergravity =

Modern theory of gravitation that combines supersymmetry and general relativity

In theoretical physics, supergravity (supergravity theory; SUGRA for short) is a modern field theory that combines the principles of supersymmetry and general relativity; this is in contrast to non-gravitational supersymmetric theories such as the Minimal Supersymmetric Standard Model. Supergravity is the gauge theory of local supersymmetry. Since the supersymmetry (SUSY) generators form together with the Poincaré algebra and superalgebra, called the super-Poincaré algebra, supersymmetry as a gauge theory makes gravity arise in a natural way.

== Gravitons ==
Like all covariant approaches to quantum gravity, supergravity contains a spin-2 field whose quantum is the graviton. Supersymmetry requires the graviton field to have a superpartner. This field has spin 3/2 and its quantum is the gravitino. The number of gravitino fields is equal to the number of supersymmetries.

== History ==
=== Gauge supersymmetry ===
The first theory of local supersymmetry was proposed by Dick Arnowitt and Pran Nath in 1975 and was called gauge supersymmetry.

=== Supergravity ===
The first model of 4-dimensional supergravity (without this denotation) was formulated by Dmitri Vasilievich Volkov and Vyacheslav A. Soroka in 1973, emphasizing the importance of spontaneous supersymmetry breaking for the possibility of a realistic model. The minimal version of 4-dimensional supergravity (with unbroken local supersymmetry) was constructed in detail in 1976 by Dan Freedman, Sergio Ferrara and Peter van Nieuwenhuizen. In 2019 the three were awarded a special Breakthrough Prize in Fundamental Physics for the discovery. The key issue of whether or not the spin 3/2 field is consistently coupled was resolved in the nearly simultaneous paper, by Stanley Deser and Bruno Zumino, which independently proposed the minimal 4-dimensional model. It was quickly generalized to many different theories in various numbers of dimensions and involving additional (N) supersymmetries. Supergravity theories with N > 1 are usually referred to as extended supergravity (SUEGRA). Some supergravity theories were shown to be related to certain higher-dimensional supergravity theories via dimensional reduction (e.g. N=1, 11-dimensional supergravity is dimensionally reduced on T^{7} to 4-dimensional, ungauged, N = 8 supergravity). The resulting theories were sometimes referred to as Kaluza–Klein theories as Theodor Kaluza and Oskar Klein constructed in 1919 a 5-dimensional gravitational theory, that when dimensionally reduced on a circle, its 4-dimensional non-massive modes describe electromagnetism coupled to gravity.

=== mSUGRA ===
mSUGRA means minimal supergravity. The construction of a realistic model of particle interactions within the N = 1 supergravity framework where supersymmetry (SUSY) breaks by a super Higgs mechanism carried out by Ali Chamseddine, Richard Arnowitt and Pran Nath in 1982. Collectively now known as minimal supergravity Grand Unification Theories (mSUGRA GUT), gravity mediates the breaking of SUSY through the existence of a hidden sector. mSUGRA naturally generates the Soft SUSY breaking terms which are a consequence of the Super Higgs effect. Radiative breaking of electroweak symmetry through renormalization group equations (RGEs) follows as an immediate consequence. Due to its predictive power, requiring only four input parameters and a sign to determine the low energy phenomenology from the scale of Grand Unification, it is widely investigated in particle physics.

=== 11D: the maximal SUGRA ===
One of these supergravities, the 11-dimensional theory, generated considerable excitement as the first potential candidate for the theory of everything. This excitement was built on four pillars, two of which have now been largely discredited:

- Werner Nahm showed 11 dimensions as the largest number of dimensions consistent with a single graviton, and more dimensions will show particles with spins greater than 2. However, if two of these dimensions are time-like, these problems are avoided in 12 dimensions. Itzhak Bars gives this emphasis.
- In 1981 Ed Witten showed 11 as the smallest number of dimensions big enough to contain the gauge groups of the Standard Model, namely SU(3) for the strong interactions and SU(2) times U(1) for the electroweak interactions. Many techniques exist to embed the standard model gauge group in supergravity in any number of dimensions like the obligatory gauge symmetry in type I and heterotic string theories, and obtained in type II string theory by compactification on certain Calabi–Yau manifolds. The D-branes engineer gauge symmetries too.
- In 1978 Eugène Cremmer, Bernard Julia and Joël Scherk (CJS) found the classical action for an 11-dimensional supergravity theory. This remains today the only known classical 11-dimensional theory with local supersymmetry and no fields of spin higher than two. Other 11-dimensional theories known and quantum-mechanically inequivalent reduce to the CJS theory when one imposes the classical equations of motion. However, in the mid-1980s Bernard de Wit and Hermann Nicolai found an alternate theory in D=11 Supergravity with Local SU(8) Invariance. While not manifestly Lorentz-invariant, it is in many ways superior, because it dimensionally-reduces to the 4-dimensional theory without recourse to the classical equations of motion.
- In 1980 Peter Freund and M. A. Rubin showed that compactification from 11 dimensions preserving all the SUSY generators could occur in two ways, leaving only 4 or 7 macroscopic dimensions, the others compact. The noncompact dimensions have to form an anti-de Sitter space. There are many possible compactifications, but the Freund-Rubin compactification's invariance under all of the supersymmetry transformations preserves the action.

Finally, the first two results each appeared to establish 11 dimensions, the third result appeared to specify the theory, and the last result explained why the observed universe appears to be four-dimensional.

Many of the details of the theory were fleshed out by Peter van Nieuwenhuizen, Sergio Ferrara and Daniel Z. Freedman.

=== The end of the SUGRA era ===
The initial excitement over 11-dimensional supergravity soon waned, as various failings were discovered, and attempts to repair the model failed as well. Problems included:

- The compact manifolds which were known at the time and which contained the standard model were not compatible with supersymmetry, and could not hold quarks or leptons. One suggestion was to replace the compact dimensions with the 7-sphere, with the symmetry group SO(8), or the squashed 7-sphere, with symmetry group SO(5) times SU(2).
- Until recently, the physical neutrinos seen in experiments were believed to be massless, and appeared to be left-handed, a phenomenon referred to as the chirality of the Standard Model. It was very difficult to construct a chiral fermion from a compactification — the compactified manifold needed to have singularities, but physics near singularities did not begin to be understood until the advent of orbifold conformal field theories in the late 1980s.
- Supergravity models generically result in an unrealistically large cosmological constant in four dimensions, and that constant is difficult to remove, and so require fine-tuning. This is still a problem today.
- Quantization of the theory led to quantum field theory gauge anomalies rendering the theory inconsistent. In the intervening years physicists have learned how to cancel these anomalies.

Some of these difficulties could be avoided by moving to a 10-dimensional theory involving superstrings. However, by moving to 10 dimensions one loses the sense of uniqueness of the 11-dimensional theory.

The core breakthrough for the 10-dimensional theory, known as the first superstring revolution, was a demonstration by Michael B. Green, John H. Schwarz and David Gross that there are only three supergravity models in 10 dimensions which have gauge symmetries and in which all of the gauge and gravitational anomalies cancel. These were theories built on the groups SO(32) and $\mathrm E_8 \times \mathrm E_8$, the direct product of two copies of E_{8}. Today we know that, using D-branes for example, gauge symmetries can be introduced in other 10-dimensional theories as well.

=== The second superstring revolution ===
Initial excitement about the 10-dimensional theories, and the string theories that provide their quantum completion, died by the end of the 1980s. There were too many Calabi–Yaus to compactify on, many more than Yau had estimated, as he admitted in December 2005 at the 23rd International Solvay Conference in Physics. None quite gave the standard model, but it seemed as though one could get close with enough effort in many distinct ways. Plus no one understood the theory beyond the regime of applicability of string perturbation theory.

There was a comparatively quiet period at the beginning of the 1990s; however, several important tools were developed. For example, it became apparent that the various superstring theories were related by "string dualities", some of which relate weak string-coupling - perturbative - physics in one model with strong string-coupling - non-perturbative - in another.

Then the second superstring revolution occurred. Joseph Polchinski realized that obscure string theory objects, called D-branes, which he discovered six years earlier, equate to stringy versions of the p-branes known in supergravity theories. String theory perturbation didn't restrict these p-branes. Thanks to supersymmetry, p-branes in supergravity gained understanding well beyond the limits of string theory.

Armed with this new nonperturbative tool, Edward Witten and many others could show all of the perturbative string theories as descriptions of different states in a single theory that Witten named M-theory. Furthermore, he argued that M-theory's long wavelength limit, i.e. when the quantum wavelength associated to objects in the theory appear much larger than the size of the 11th dimension, needs 11-dimensional supergravity descriptors that fell out of favor with the first superstring revolution 10 years earlier, accompanied by the 2- and 5-branes.

Therefore, supergravity comes full circle and uses a common framework in understanding features of string theories, M-theory, and their compactifications to lower spacetime dimensions.

== Relation to superstrings ==
The term "low energy limits" labels some 10-dimensional supergravity theories. These arise as the massless, tree-level approximation of string theories. True effective field theories of string theories, rather than truncations, are rarely available. Due to string dualities, the conjectured 11-dimensional M-theory is required to have 11-dimensional supergravity as a "low energy limit". However, this doesn't necessarily mean that string theory/M-theory is the only possible UV completion of supergravity; supergravity research is useful independent of those relations.

== 4D N = 1 SUGRA ==
Before we move on to SUGRA proper, let's recapitulate some important details about general relativity. We have a 4D differentiable manifold M with a Spin(3,1) principal bundle over it. This principal bundle represents the local Lorentz symmetry. In addition, we have a vector bundle T over the manifold with the fiber having four real dimensions and transforming as a vector under Spin(3,1). We have an invertible linear map from the tangent bundle TM to T. This map is the vierbein. The local Lorentz symmetry has a gauge connection associated with it, the spin connection.

The following discussion will be in superspace notation, as opposed to the component notation, which isn't manifestly covariant under SUSY. There are actually many different versions of SUGRA out there which are inequivalent in the sense that their actions and constraints upon the torsion tensor are different, but ultimately equivalent in that we can always perform a field redefinition of the supervierbeins and spin connection to get from one version to another.

In 4D N=1 SUGRA, we have a 4|4 real differentiable supermanifold M, i.e. we have 4 real bosonic dimensions and 4 real fermionic dimensions. As in the nonsupersymmetric case, we have a Spin(3,1) principal bundle over M. We have an R^{4|4} vector bundle T over M. The fiber of T transforms under the local Lorentz group as follows; the four real bosonic dimensions transform as a vector and the four real fermionic dimensions transform as a Majorana spinor. This Majorana spinor can be reexpressed as a complex left-handed Weyl spinor and its complex conjugate right-handed Weyl spinor (they're not independent of each other). We also have a spin connection as before.

We will use the following conventions; the spatial (both bosonic and fermionic) indices will be indicated by M, N, ... . The bosonic spatial indices will be indicated by μ, ν, ..., the left-handed Weyl spatial indices by α, β,..., and the right-handed Weyl spatial indices by $\dot{\alpha}$, $\dot{\beta}$, ... . The indices for the fiber of T will follow a similar notation, except that they will be hatted like this: $\hat{M},\hat{\alpha}$. See van der Waerden notation for more details. $M = (\mu,\alpha,\dot{\alpha})$. The supervierbein is denoted by $e^{\hat{M}}_N$, and the spin connection by $\omega_{\hat{M}\hat{N}P}$. The inverse supervierbein is denoted by $E^N_{\hat{M}}$.

The supervierbein and spin connection are real in the sense that they satisfy the reality conditions

$e^{\hat{M}}_N (x,\overline{\theta},\theta)^* = e^{\hat{M}^*}_{N^*}(x,\theta,\overline{\theta})$ where $\mu^*=\mu$, $\alpha^*=\dot{\alpha}$, and $\dot{\alpha}^*=\alpha$ and $\omega(x,\overline{\theta},\theta)^*=\omega(x,\theta,\overline{\theta})$.

The covariant derivative is defined as

$$D_\hat{M}f=E^N_{\hat{M}}\left( \partial_N f + \omega_N[f] \right)$$.

The covariant exterior derivative as defined over supermanifolds needs to be super graded. This means that every time we interchange two fermionic indices, we pick up a +1 sign factor, instead of -1.

The presence or absence of R symmetries is optional, but if R-symmetry exists, the integrand over the full superspace has to have an R-charge of 0 and the integrand over chiral superspace has to have an R-charge of 2.

A chiral superfield X is a superfield which satisfies $\overline{D}_{\hat{\dot{\alpha}}}X=0$. In order for this constraint to be consistent, we require the integrability conditions that $\left\{ \overline{D}_{\hat{\dot{\alpha}}}, \overline{D}_{\hat{\dot{\beta}}} \right\} = c_{\hat{\dot{\alpha}}\hat{\dot{\beta}}}^{\hat{\dot{\gamma}}} \overline{D}_{\hat{\dot{\gamma}}}$ for some coefficients c.

Unlike nonSUSY GR, the torsion has to be nonzero, at least with respect to the fermionic directions. Already, even in flat superspace, $D_{\hat{\alpha}}e_{\hat{\dot{\alpha}}}+\overline{D}_{\hat{\dot{\alpha}}}e_{\hat{\alpha}} \neq 0$. In one version of SUGRA (but certainly not the only one), we have the following constraints upon the torsion tensor:

$$T^{\hat{\underline{\gamma}}}_{\hat{\underline{\alpha}}\hat{\underline{\beta}}} = 0$$
$$T^{\hat{\mu}}_{\hat{\alpha}\hat{\beta}} = 0$$
$$T^{\hat{\mu}}_{\hat{\dot{\alpha}}\hat{\dot{\beta}}} = 0$$
$$T^{\hat{\mu}}_{\hat{\alpha}\hat{\dot{\beta}}} = 2i\sigma^{\hat{\mu}}_{\hat{\alpha}\hat{\dot{\beta}}}$$
$$T^{\hat{\nu}}_{\hat{\mu}\hat{\underline{\alpha}}} = 0$$
$$T^{\hat{\rho}}_{\hat{\mu}\hat{\nu}} = 0$$

Here, $\underline{\alpha}$ is a shorthand notation to mean the index runs over either the left or right Weyl spinors.

The superdeterminant of the supervierbein, $\left| e \right|$, gives us the volume factor for M. Equivalently, we have the volume 4|4-superform$e^{\hat{\mu}=0}\wedge \cdots \wedge e^{\hat{\mu}=3} \wedge e^{\hat{\alpha}=1} \wedge e^{\hat{\alpha}=2} \wedge e^{\hat{\dot{\alpha}}=1} \wedge e^{\hat{\dot{\alpha}}=2}$.

If we complexify the superdiffeomorphisms, there is a gauge where $E^{\mu}_{\hat{\dot{\alpha}}}=0$, $E^{\beta}_{\hat{\dot{\alpha}}}=0$ and $E^{\dot{\beta}}_{\hat{\dot{\alpha}}}=\delta^{\dot{\beta}}_{\dot{\alpha}}$. The resulting chiral superspace has the coordinates x and Θ.

R is a scalar valued chiral superfield derivable from the supervielbeins and spin connection. If f is any superfield, $\left( \bar{D}^2 - 8R \right) f$ is always a chiral superfield.

The action for a SUGRA theory with chiral superfields X, is given by

$$S = \int d^4x d^2\Theta 2\mathcal{E}\left[ \frac{3}{8} \left( \bar{D}^2 - 8R \right) e^{-K(\bar{X},X)/3} + W(X) \right] + c.c.$$

where K is the Kähler potential and W is the superpotential, and $\mathcal{E}$ is the chiral volume factor.

Unlike the case for flat superspace, adding a constant to either the Kähler or superpotential is now physical. A constant shift to the Kähler potential changes the effective Planck constant, while a constant shift to the superpotential changes the effective cosmological constant. As the effective Planck constant now depends upon the value of the chiral superfield X, we need to rescale the supervierbeins (a field redefinition) to get a constant Planck constant. This is called the Einstein frame.

== N = 8 supergravity in 4 dimensions ==
N = 8 supergravity is the most symmetric quantum field theory which involves gravity and a finite number of fields. It can be found from a dimensional reduction of 11D supergravity by making the size of 7 of the dimensions go to zero. It has 8 supersymmetries which is the most any gravitational theory can have since there are 8 half-steps between spin 2 and spin −2. (A graviton has the highest spin in this theory which is a spin 2 particle.) More supersymmetries would mean the particles would have superpartners with spins higher than 2. The only theories with spins higher than 2 which are consistent involve an infinite number of particles (such as string theory and higher-spin theories). Stephen Hawking in his A Brief History of Time speculated that this theory could be the theory of everything. However, in later years this was abandoned in favour of string theory. There has been renewed interest in the 21st century with the possibility that this theory may be finite.

== Higher-dimensional SUGRA ==
Higher-dimensional SUGRA is the higher-dimensional, supersymmetric generalization of general relativity. Supergravity can be formulated in any number of dimensions up to eleven. Higher-dimensional SUGRA focuses upon supergravity in greater than four dimensions.

The number of supercharges in a spinor depends on the dimension and the signature of spacetime. The supercharges occur in spinors. Thus the limit on the number of supercharges cannot be satisfied in a spacetime of arbitrary dimension. Some theoretical examples in which this is satisfied are:

- 12-dimensional two-time theory
- 11-dimensional maximal supergravity
- 10-dimensional supergravity theories
  - Type IIA supergravity: N = (1, 1)
  - Type IIB supergravity: N = (2, 0)
  - Type I supergravity: N = (1, 0)
- 9d supergravity theories
  - Maximal 9d supergravity from 10d
  - T-duality
  - N = 1 Gauged supergravity

The supergravity theories that have attracted the most interest contain no spins higher than two. This means, in particular, that they do not contain any fields that transform as symmetric tensors of rank higher than two under Lorentz transformations. The consistency of interacting higher spin field theories is, however, presently a field of very active interest.

== See also ==
- Conformal supergravity
- General relativity
- Grand Unified Theory
- M-theory
- N = 8 supergravity
- Quantum mechanics
- String theory
- Supermanifold
- Super-Poincaré algebra
- Supersymmetry
- Supermetric

== Bibliography ==
=== Historical ===
- Volkov, D.V.; Soroka, V.A (1973). "Higgs effect for goldstone particles with spin 1/2". Supersymmetry and Quantum Field Theory. Lecture Notes in Physics. Vol. 18. pp. 529–533. Bibcode:1973JETPL..18..312V. doi:10.1007/BFb0105271. ISBN 978-3-540-64623-5.
- Nath, P.; Arnowitt, R. (1975). "Generalized super-gauge symmetry as a new framework for unified gauge theories". Physics Letters B. 56 (2): 177. Bibcode:1975PhLB...56..177N. doi:10.1016/0370-2693(75)90297-x.
- Freedman, D.Z.; van Nieuwenhuizen, P.; Ferrara, S. (1976). "Progress toward a theory of supergravity". Physical Review D. 13 (12): 3214–3218. Bibcode:1976PhRvD..13.3214F. doi:10.1103/physrevd.13.3214.
- Cremmer, E.; Julia, B.; Scherk, J. (1978). "Supergravity in theory in 11 dimensions". Physics Letters B. 76 (4): 409–412. Bibcode:1978PhLB...76..409C. doi:10.1016/0370-2693(78)90894-8.
- Freund, P.; Rubin, M. (1980). "Dynamics of dimensional reduction". Physics Letters B. 97 (2): 233–235. Bibcode:1980PhLB...97..233F. doi:10.1016/0370-2693(80)90590-0.
- Chamseddine, A. H.; Arnowitt, R.; Nath, Pran (1982). "Locally supersymmetric grand unification". Physical Review Letters. 49 (14): 970–974. Bibcode:1982PhRvL..49..970C. doi:10.1103/PhysRevLett.49.970.
- Green, Michael B.; Schwarz, John H. (1984). "Anomaly cancellation in supersymmetric D = 10 gauge theory and superstring theory". Physics Letters B. 149 (1–3): 117–122. Bibcode:1984PhLB..149..117G. doi:10.1016/0370-2693(84)91565-x.
- Deser, S. (2018). "A brief history (and geography) of supergravity: The first 3 weeks... and after" (PDF). The European Physical Journal H. 43 (3): 281–291. arXiv:1704.05886. Bibcode:2018EPJH...43..281D. doi:10.1140/epjh/e2018-90005-3. S2CID 119428513.
- Duplij, S. (2019). "Supergravity was discovered by D.V. Volkov and V.A. Soroka in 1973, wasn't it?". East European Journal of Physics (3): 81–82. arXiv:1910.03259. doi:10.26565/2312-4334-2019-3-10.

=== General ===
- de Wit, Bernard (2002). "Supergravity". arXiv:hep-th/0212245.
- Pran, Nath (2017). Supersymmetry, Supergravity, and Unification. Cambridge University Press. ISBN 978-0-521-19702-1.
- Martin, Stephen P. (1998). "A Supersymmetry Primer". In Kane, Gordon L. (ed.). Perspectives on Supersymmetry. Advanced Series on Directions in High Energy Physics. Vol. 18. World Scientific. pp. 1–98. arXiv:hep-ph/9709356. doi:10.1142/9789812839657_0001. ISBN 978-981-02-3553-6. S2CID 118973381.
- Drees, Manuel; Godbole, Rohini M.; Roy, Probir (2004). Theory and Phenomenology of Sparticles. World Scientific. ISBN 9-810-23739-1.
- Bilal, Adel (2001). "Introduction to Supersymmetry". arXiv:hep-th/0101055.
- Brandt, Friedemann (2002). "Lectures on Supergravity". Fortschritte der Physik. 50 (10–11): 1126–1172. arXiv:hep-th/0204035. Bibcode:2002ForPh..50.1126B. doi:10.1002/1521-3978(200210)50:10/11<1126::AID-PROP1126>3.0.CO;2-B. S2CID 15471713.
- Sezgin, Ergin (2023). "Survey of supergravities". arXiv:2312.06754 [hep-th].
