= N = 1 supersymmetric Yang–Mills theory =

Supersymmetric generalization of Yang–Mills

In theoretical physics, more specifically in quantum field theory and supersymmetry, supersymmetric Yang–Mills, also known as super Yang–Mills and abbreviated to SYM, is a supersymmetric generalization of Yang–Mills theory, which is a gauge theory that plays an important part in the mathematical formulation of forces in particle physics. It is a special case of 4D N = 1 global supersymmetry.

Super Yang–Mills was studied by Julius Wess and Bruno Zumino in which they demonstrated the supergauge-invariance of the theory and wrote down its action, alongside the action of the Wess–Zumino model, another early supersymmetric field theory.

The treatment in this article largely follows that of Figueroa-O'Farrill's lectures on supersymmetry and of Tong.

While N = 4 supersymmetric Yang–Mills theory is also a supersymmetric Yang–Mills theory, it has very different properties to $\mathcal{N} = 1$ supersymmetric Yang–Mills theory, which is the theory discussed in this article. The $\mathcal{N} = 2$ supersymmetric Yang–Mills theory was studied by Seiberg and Witten in Seiberg–Witten theory. All three theories are based in $d = 4$ super Minkowski spaces.

== The supersymmetric Yang–Mills action ==
=== Preliminary treatment ===
A first treatment can be done without defining superspace, instead defining the theory in terms of familiar fields in non-supersymmetric quantum field theory.

==== Spacetime and matter content ====
The base spacetime is flat spacetime (Minkowski space).

SYM is a gauge theory, and there is an associated gauge group $G$ to the theory. The gauge group has associated Lie algebra $\mathfrak{g}$.

The field content then consists of

- a $\mathfrak{g}$-valued gauge field $A_\mu$
- a $\mathfrak{g}$-valued Majorana spinor field $\Psi$ (an adjoint-valued spinor), known as the 'gaugino'
- a $\mathfrak{g}$-valued auxiliary scalar field $D$.

For gauge-invariance, the gauge field $A_\mu$ is necessarily massless. This means its superpartner $\Psi$ is also massless if supersymmetry is to hold. Therefore $\Psi$ can be written in terms of two Weyl spinors which are conjugate to one another: $\Psi = (\lambda, \bar \lambda)$, and the theory can be formulated in terms of the Weyl spinor field $\lambda$ instead of $\Psi$.

==== Supersymmetric pure electromagnetic theory ====
When $G = U(1)$, the conceptual difficulties simplify somewhat, and this is in some sense the simplest gauge theory. The field content is simply a (co-)vector field $A_\mu$, a Majorana spinor $\Psi$ and a auxiliary real scalar field $D$.

The field strength tensor is defined as usual as $F_{\mu\nu} := \partial_\mu A_\nu - \partial_\nu A_\mu$.

The Lagrangian written down by Wess and Zumino is then

$$\mathcal{L} = - \frac{1}{4}F_{\mu\nu}F^{\mu\nu} - \frac{i}{2}\bar\Psi\gamma^\mu \partial_\mu\Psi + \frac{1}{2}D^2.$$

This can be generalized to include a coupling constant $e$, and theta term $\propto \vartheta F_{\mu\nu}*F^{\mu\nu}$, where $*F^{\mu\nu}$ is the dual field strength tensor

$$*F^{\mu\nu} = \frac{1}{2}\epsilon^{\mu\nu\rho\sigma}F_{\rho\sigma}.$$

and $\epsilon^{\mu\nu\rho\sigma}$ is the alternating tensor or totally antisymmetric tensor. If we also replace the field $\Psi$ with the Weyl spinor $\lambda$, then a supersymmetric action can be written as

Supersymmetric Maxwell theory (preliminary form)

$S_{\text{SMaxwell}} = \int d^4x \left[-\frac{1}{4e^2}F_{\mu\nu}F^{\mu\nu} + \frac{\vartheta}{32\pi^2}F_{\mu\nu}*F^{\mu\nu} - \frac{i}{e^2}\lambda\sigma^\mu\partial_\mu \bar\lambda + \frac{1}{2e^2}D^2\right]$

This can be viewed as a supersymmetric generalization of a pure $U(1)$ gauge theory, also known as Maxwell theory or pure electromagnetic theory.

==== Supersymmetric Yang–Mills theory (preliminary treatment) ====
In full generality, we must define the gluon field strength tensor,

$$F_{\mu\nu} = \partial_\mu A_\nu - \partial_\nu A_\mu - i[A_\mu, A_\nu]$$

and the covariant derivative of the adjoint Weyl spinor, $D_\mu \lambda = \partial_\mu\lambda - i[A_\mu, \lambda].$

To write down the action, an invariant inner product on $\mathfrak{g}$ is needed: the Killing form $B(\cdot, \cdot)$ is such an inner product, and in a typical abuse of notation we write $B$ simply as $\text{Tr}$, suggestive of the fact that the invariant inner product arises as the trace in some representation of $\mathfrak{g}$.

Supersymmetric Yang–Mills then readily generalizes from supersymmetric Maxwell theory. A simple version is

$$S_{\text{SYM}} = \int d^4x \text{Tr}\left[-\frac{1}{4}F_{\mu\nu}F^{\mu\nu} - \frac{1}{2}\bar\Psi \gamma^\mu D_\mu \Psi\right]$$

while a more general version is given by

Supersymmetric Yang–Mills theory (preliminary form)

$S_{\text{SYM}} = \int d^4x \text{Tr}\left[-\frac{1}{2g^2}F_{\mu\nu}F^{\mu\nu} + \frac{\vartheta}{16\pi^2}F_{\mu\nu}*F^{\mu\nu} - \frac{2i}{g^2}\lambda\sigma^\mu D_\mu \bar\lambda + \frac{1}{g^2}D^2\right]$

=== Superspace treatment ===
==== Superspace and superfield content ====
The base superspace is $\mathcal{N} = 1$ super Minkowski space.

The theory is defined in terms of a single adjoint-valued real superfield $V$, fixed to be in Wess–Zumino gauge.

==== Supersymmetric Maxwell theory on superspace ====
The theory is defined in terms of a superfield arising from taking covariant derivatives of $V$:

$$W_\alpha = -\frac{1}{4}\mathcal{\bar D^2}\mathcal{D}_\alpha V$$.

The supersymmetric action is then written down, with a complex coupling constant $\tau = \frac{\vartheta}{2\pi} + \frac{4\pi i}{e}$, as

Supersymmetric Maxwell theory (superspace form)

$S_{\text{SMaxwell}} = -\int d^4x \left[\int d^2 \theta \frac{i\tau}{16\pi}W^\alpha W_\alpha + \text{h.c.}\right]$

where h.c. indicates the Hermitian conjugate of the preceding term.

==== Supersymmetric Yang–Mills on superspace ====
For non-abelian gauge theory, instead define

$$W_\alpha = -\frac{1}{8}\bar\mathcal{D}^2(e^{-2V}\mathcal{D}_\alpha e^{2V})$$

and $\tau = \frac{\vartheta}{2\pi} + \frac{4\pi i}{g}$. Then the action is

Supersymmetric Yang–Mills theory (superspace form)

$S_{\text{SYM}} = -\int d^4x \text{Tr}\left[\int d^2 \theta \frac{i\tau}{8\pi}W^\alpha W_\alpha + \text{h.c.}\right]$

== Symmetries of the action ==
=== Supersymmetry ===
For the simplified Yang–Mills action on Minkowski space (not on superspace), the supersymmetry transformations are

$$\delta_\epsilon A_\mu = \bar\epsilon \gamma_\mu \Psi$$
$$\delta_\epsilon \Psi = -\frac{1}{2} F_{\mu\nu}\gamma^{\mu\nu}\epsilon$$

where $\gamma^{\mu\nu} = \frac{1}{2}(\gamma^\mu \gamma^\nu - \gamma^\nu \gamma^\mu)$.

For the Yang–Mills action on superspace, since $W_\alpha$ is chiral, then so are fields built from $W_\alpha$. Then integrating over half of superspace, $\int d^2\theta$, gives a supersymmetric action.

An important observation is that the Wess–Zumino gauge is not a supersymmetric gauge, that is, it is not preserved by supersymmetry. However, it is possible to do a compensating gauge transformation to return to Wess–Zumino gauge. Then, after a supersymmetry transformation and the compensating gauge transformation, the superfields transform as

$$\delta A_\mu = \epsilon \sigma_\mu \bar \lambda + \lambda \sigma_\mu \bar \epsilon,$$
$$\delta \lambda = \epsilon D + (\sigma^{\mu\nu}\epsilon)F_{\mu\nu}$$
$$\delta D = i\epsilon \sigma^\mu\partial_\mu \bar \lambda - i \partial_\mu \lambda \bar \sigma^\mu \bar \epsilon.$$

=== Gauge symmetry ===
The preliminary theory defined on spacetime is manifestly gauge invariant as it is built from terms studied in non-supersymmetric gauge theory which are gauge invariant.

The superfield formulation requires a theory of generalized gauge transformations. (Not supergauge transformations, which would be transformations in a theory with local supersymmetry).

==== Generalized abelian gauge transformations ====
Such a transformation is parametrized by a chiral superfield $\Omega$, under which the real superfield transforms as

$$V \mapsto V + i(\Omega - \Omega^\dagger).$$

In particular, upon expanding $V$ and $\Omega$ appropriately into constituent superfields, then $V$ contains a vector superfield $A_\mu$ while $\Omega$ contains a scalar superfield $\omega$, such that

$$A_\mu \mapsto A_\mu - 2 \partial_\mu (\text{Re}\,\omega) =: A_\mu + \partial_\mu \alpha.$$

The chiral superfield used to define the action,

$$W_\alpha = -\frac{1}{4} \bar\mathcal{D}^2 \mathcal{D}_\alpha V,$$

is gauge invariant.

==== Generalized non-abelian gauge transformations ====
The chiral superfield is adjoint valued. The transformation of $V$ is prescribed by

$$e^{2V} \mapsto e^{-2i\Omega^\dagger}e^{2V}e^{2i\Omega}$$,

from which the transformation for $V$ can be derived using the Baker–Campbell–Hausdorff formula.

The chiral superfield $W_\alpha = -\frac{1}{8} \bar\mathcal{D}^2(e^{-2V} \mathcal{D}_\alpha e^{2V})$ is not invariant but transforms by conjugation:

$$W_\alpha \mapsto e^{2i\Omega}W_\alpha e^{-2i\Omega}$$,

so that upon tracing in the action, the action is gauge-invariant.

== Extra classical symmetries ==
=== Superconformal symmetry ===
As a classical theory, supersymmetric Yang–Mills theory admits a larger set of symmetries, described at the algebra level by the superconformal algebra. Just as the super Poincaré algebra is a supersymmetric extension of the Poincaré algebra, the superconformal algebra is a supersymmetric extension of the conformal algebra which also contains a spinorial generator of conformal supersymmetry $S_\alpha$.

Conformal invariance is broken in the quantum theory by trace and conformal anomalies.

While the quantum $\mathcal{N} = 1$ supersymmetric Yang–Mills theory does not have superconformal symmetry, quantum N = 4 supersymmetric Yang–Mills theory does.

=== R-symmetry ===
The $\text{U}(1)$ R-symmetry for $\mathcal{N} = 1$ supersymmetry is a symmetry of the classical theory, but not of the quantum theory due to an anomaly.

== Adding matter ==
=== Abelian gauge ===
Matter can be added in the form of Wess–Zumino model type superfields $\Phi$. Under a gauge transformation,

$$\Phi \mapsto \exp(- 2iq\Omega)\Phi$$,

and instead of using just $\Phi^\dagger \Phi$ as the Lagrangian as in the Wess–Zumino model, for gauge invariance it must be replaced with $\Phi^\dagger e^{2q V} \Phi.$

This gives a supersymmetric analogue to QED. The action can be written

$$S_{\text{SMaxwell}} + \int d^4x \, \int d^4\theta \, \Phi^\dagger e^{2qV} \Phi.$$

For $N_f$ flavours, we instead have $N_f$ superfields $\Phi_i$, and the action can be written

$$S_{\text{SMaxwell}} + \int d^4x \, \int d^4\theta \, \Phi_i^\dagger e^{2q_iV} \Phi_i.$$

with implicit summation.

However, for a well-defined quantum theory, a theory such as that defined above suffers a gauge anomaly. We are obliged to add a partner $\tilde \Phi$ to each chiral superfield $\Phi$ (distinct from the idea of superpartners, and from conjugate superfields), which has opposite charge. This gives the action

$$S_{\text{SQED}} = S_{\text{SMaxwell}} + \int d^4x \, \int d^4\theta \, \Phi_i^\dagger e^{2q_iV} \Phi_i + \tilde\Phi_i^\dagger e^{-2q_iV} \tilde\Phi_i.$$

=== Non-Abelian gauge ===
For non-abelian gauge, matter chiral superfields $\Phi$ are now valued in a representation $R$ of the gauge group: $\Phi \mapsto \exp(-2i\Omega)\Phi$.

The Wess–Zumino kinetic term must be adjusted to $\Phi^\dagger e^{2V} \Phi$.

Then a simple SQCD action would be to take $R$ to be the fundamental representation, and add the Wess–Zumino term:

$$S_{\text{SYM}} + \int d^4x \, d^4\theta \, \Phi^\dagger e^{2V} \Phi$$.

More general and detailed forms of the super QCD action are given in that article.

== Fayet–Iliopoulos term ==
When the center of the Lie algebra $\mathfrak{g}$ is non-trivial, there is an extra term which can be added to the action known as the Fayet–Iliopoulos term.
