= Wess–Zumino model =

Type of supersymmetric quantum field theory

In theoretical physics, the Wess–Zumino model has become the first known example of an interacting four-dimensional quantum field theory with linearly realised supersymmetry. In 1974, Julius Wess and Bruno Zumino studied, using modern terminology, dynamics of a single chiral superfield (composed of a complex scalar and a spinor fermion) whose cubic superpotential leads to a renormalizable theory. It is a special case of 4D N = 1 global supersymmetry.

The treatment in this article largely follows that of Figueroa-O'Farrill's lectures on supersymmetry, and to some extent of Tong.

The model is an important model in supersymmetric quantum field theory. It is arguably the simplest supersymmetric field theory in four dimensions, and is ungauged.

== The Wess–Zumino action ==
=== Preliminary treatment ===
==== Spacetime and matter content ====
In a preliminary treatment, the theory is defined on flat spacetime (Minkowski space). For this article, the metric has mostly plus signature. The matter content is a real scalar field $S$, a real pseudoscalar field $P$, and a real (Majorana) spinor field $\psi$.

This is a preliminary treatment in the sense that the theory is written in terms of familiar scalar and spinor fields which are functions of spacetime, without developing a theory of superspace or superfields, which appear later in the article.

==== Free, massless theory ====
The Lagrangian of the free, massless Wess–Zumino model is

$$\mathcal{L}_{\text{kin}}=-\frac{1}{2}(\partial S)^{2}-\frac{1}{2}(\partial P)^{2}-\frac{1}{2}\bar{\psi} \partial\!\!\!/ \psi,$$

where

- $\partial \!\!\!/ = \gamma^\mu \partial_\mu$
- $\bar \psi = \psi^t C = \psi^\dagger i \gamma^0.$

The corresponding action is

$$I_{\text{kin}} = \int d^4x \mathcal{L}_{\text{kin}}$$.

==== Massive theory ====
Supersymmetry is preserved when adding a mass term of the form

$$\mathcal{L}_{\text{m}} = -\frac{1}{2}m^2 S^2 -\frac{1}{2}m^2 P^2 - \frac{1}{2}m\bar{\psi}\psi$$

==== Interacting theory ====
Supersymmetry is preserved when adding an interaction term with coupling constant $\lambda$:

$$\mathcal{L}_{\text{int}} = -\lambda\left(\bar\psi(S-P\gamma_5)\psi + \frac{1}{2}\lambda(S^2 + P^2)^2 + mS(S^2 + P^2)\right).$$

The full Wess–Zumino action is then given by putting these Lagrangians together:

Wess–Zumino action (preliminary treatment)

$I_{\text{WZ}} = \int d^4x\ (\mathcal{L}_{\text{kin}} + \mathcal{L}_{\text{m}} + \mathcal{L}_{\text{int}})$

==== Alternative expression ====
There is an alternative way of organizing the fields. The real fields $S$ and $P$ are combined into a single complex scalar field $\phi := \frac{1}{2}(S + iP),$ while the Majorana spinor is written in terms of two Weyl spinors: $\psi = (\chi^\alpha, \bar \chi_\dot\alpha)$. Defining the superpotential

$$W(\phi):= \frac{1}{2}m\phi^2 + \frac{1}{3}\lambda \phi^3,$$

the Wess–Zumino action can also be written (possibly after relabelling some constant factors)

Wess–Zumino action (preliminary treatment, alternative expression)

$I_{\text{WZ}} = \int d^4x \left[\partial_\mu \phi^\dagger \partial^\mu \phi - i\chi\sigma^\mu \partial_\mu \bar\chi - \left|\frac{\partial W}{\partial\phi}\right|^2 - \frac{1}{2}\frac{\partial^2W}{\partial \phi^2}\chi\chi - \frac{1}{2}\frac{\partial^2W^\dagger}{\partial \phi^{\dagger 2}}\bar\chi\bar\chi\right]$

Upon substituting in $W(\phi)$, one finds that this is a theory with a massive complex scalar $\phi$ and a massive Majorana spinor $\psi$ of the same mass. The interactions are a cubic and quartic $\phi$ interaction, and a Yukawa interaction between $\phi$ and $\psi$, which are all familiar interactions from courses in non-supersymmetric quantum field theory.

=== Using superspace and superfields ===
==== Superspace and superfield content ====
Superspace consists of the direct sum of Minkowski space with 'spin space', a four dimensional space with coordinates $(\theta_\alpha, \bar\theta^\dot\alpha)$, where $\alpha, \dot\alpha$ are indices taking values in $1,2.$ More formally, superspace is constructed as the space of right cosets of the Lorentz group in the super-Poincaré group.

The fact there is only 4 'spin coordinates' means that this is a theory with what is known as $\mathcal{N} = 1$ supersymmetry, corresponding to an algebra with a single supercharge. The $8 = 4 + 4$ dimensional superspace is sometimes written $\mathbb{R}^{1,3|4}$, and called super Minkowski space. The 'spin coordinates' are so called not due to any relation to angular momentum, but because they are treated as anti-commuting numbers, a property typical of spinors in quantum field theory due to the spin statistics theorem.

A superfield $\Phi$ is then a function on superspace, $\Phi = \Phi(x, \theta, \bar\theta)$.

Defining the supercovariant derivative

$$\bar D_\dot\alpha = \bar\partial_\dot\alpha - i(\bar\sigma^\mu)_{\dot\alpha\beta}\theta^\beta\partial_\mu,$$

a chiral superfield satisfies $\bar D_\dot\alpha \Phi = 0.$ The field content is then simply a single chiral superfield.

However, the chiral superfield contains fields, in the sense that it admits the expansion

$$\Phi(x, \theta, \bar\theta) = \phi(y) + \theta \chi(y) + \theta^2 F(y)$$

with $y^\mu = x^\mu - i\theta\sigma^\mu \bar\theta.$ Then $\phi$ can be identified as a complex scalar, $\chi$ is a Weyl spinor and $F$ is an auxiliary complex scalar.

These fields admit a further relabelling, with $\phi = \frac{1}{2}(S + iP)$ and $\psi^a = (\chi^\alpha, \bar\chi_{\dot\alpha}).$ This allows recovery of the preliminary forms, after eliminating the non-dynamical $F$ using its equation of motion.

==== Free, massless action ====
When written in terms of the chiral superfield $\Phi$, the action (for the free, massless Wess–Zumino model) takes on the simple form

$$\int d^4x d^2\theta d^2\bar\theta \,\, 2\bar\Phi \Phi$$

where $\int d^2\theta, \int d^2\bar\theta$ are integrals over spinor dimensions of superspace.

==== Superpotential ====
Masses and interactions are added through a superpotential. The Wess–Zumino superpotential is

$$W(\Phi) = m\Phi^2 + \frac{4}{3}\lambda\Phi^3.$$

Since $W(\Phi)$ is complex, to ensure the action is real its conjugate must also be added. The full Wess–Zumino action is written

Wess–Zumino action

$I_{\text{WZ}} = \int d^4x \left[\int d^2\theta d^2\bar\theta \,\, \bar\Phi\Phi\right] + \left[\int d^2\theta W(\Phi) + \int d^2\bar\theta \bar W(\bar\Phi)\right]$

== Supersymmetry of the action ==
=== Preliminary treatment ===
The action is invariant under the supersymmetry transformations, given in infinitesimal form by

$$\delta_{\epsilon} S=\bar{\epsilon} \psi$$
$$\delta_{\epsilon} P =\bar{\epsilon} \gamma_{5} \psi$$
$$\delta_{\epsilon} \psi = [\partial\!\!\!/ - m - \lambda (S+P\gamma_{5}) ] (S+P\gamma_{5})\epsilon$$

where $\epsilon$ is a Majorana spinor-valued transformation parameter and $\gamma_{5}$ is the chirality operator.

The alternative form is invariant under the transformation

$$\delta_\epsilon \phi = \sqrt 2 \epsilon \chi$$
$$\delta_\epsilon \chi = \sqrt 2 i \sigma^\mu \bar\epsilon \partial_\mu \phi - \sqrt 2 \epsilon \frac{\partial W^\dagger}{\partial \phi^\dagger}$$.

Without developing a theory of superspace transformations, these symmetries appear ad-hoc.

=== Superfield treatment ===
If the action can be written as $S = \int d^4 x d^4 \theta K(x, \theta, \bar \theta)$ where $K$ is a real superfield, that is, $K^\dagger = K$, then the action is invariant under supersymmetry.

Then the reality of $K = \bar\Phi \Phi$ means it is invariant under supersymmetry.

== Extra classical symmetries ==
=== Superconformal symmetry ===
The massless Wess–Zumino model admits a larger set of symmetries, described at the algebra level by the superconformal algebra. As well as the Poincaré symmetry generators and the supersymmetry translation generators, this contains the conformal algebra as well as a conformal supersymmetry generator $S_\alpha$.

The conformal symmetry is broken at the quantum level by trace and conformal anomalies, which break invariance under the conformal generators $D$ for dilatations and $K_\mu$ for special conformal transformations respectively.

=== R-symmetry ===
The $\text{U}(1)$ R-symmetry of $\mathcal{N} = 1$ supersymmetry holds when the superpotential $W(\Phi)$ is a monomial. This means either $W(\phi) = \frac{1}{2}m\phi^2$, so that the superfield $\Phi$ is massive but free (non-interacting), or $W(\Phi) = \frac{1}{3}\lambda\phi^3$ so the theory is massless but (possibly) interacting.

This is broken at the quantum level by anomalies.

== Action for multiple chiral superfields ==
The action generalizes straightforwardly to multiple chiral superfields $\Phi^i$ with $i = 1, \cdots, N$. The most general renormalizable theory is

$$I = \int d^4 x \, d^4\theta \, K_{i\bar j}\Phi^i\Phi^{\dagger\bar j} + \int d^4 x \left[ \int d^2 \theta \, W(\Phi) + \text{h.c.} \right]$$

where the superpotential is

$$W(\Phi) = a_i\Phi^i + \frac{1}{2} m_{ij} \Phi^i \Phi^j + \frac{1}{3} \lambda_{ijk} \Phi^i \Phi^j \Phi^k$$,

where implicit summation is used.

By a change of coordinates, under which $\Phi^i$ transforms under $\text{GL}(N, \mathbb{C})$, one can set $K_{i\bar j} = \delta_{i \bar j}$ without loss of generality. With this choice, the expression $K = \delta_{i \bar j} \Phi^i \Phi^{\dagger \bar j}$ is known as the canonical Kähler potential. There is residual freedom to make a unitary transformation in order to diagonalise the mass matrix $m_{ij}$.

When $N = 1$, if the multiplet is massive then the Weyl fermion has a Majorana mass. But for $N = 2,$ the two Weyl fermions can have a Dirac mass, when the superpotential is taken to be $W(\Phi, \tilde \Phi) = m\tilde\Phi\Phi.$ This theory has a $\text{U}(1)$ symmetry, where $\Phi, \tilde\Phi$ rotate with opposite charges

=== Super QCD ===
For general $N$, a superpotential of the form $W(\Phi_a, \tilde \Phi_a) = m\tilde\Phi_a\Phi_a$ has a $\text{SU}(N)$ symmetry when $\Phi_a, \tilde\Phi_a$ rotate with opposite charges, that is under $U \in \text{SU}(N)$

$$\Phi_a \mapsto U_a{}^b\Phi_b$$
$$\tilde \Phi_a \mapsto (U^{-1})_a{}^b\tilde\Phi_b$$.

This symmetry can be gauged and coupled to supersymmetric Yang–Mills to form a supersymmetric analogue to quantum chromodynamics, known as super QCD.

=== Supersymmetric sigma models ===
If renormalizability is not insisted upon, then there are two possible generalizations. The first of these is to consider more general superpotentials. The second is to consider $K$ in the kinetic term

$$S = \int d^4x \, d^2\theta^2 \, d^2\bar\theta^2 K(\Phi, \bar\Phi)$$

to be a real function $K = K(\Phi, \bar\Phi)$ of $\Phi^i$ and $\bar\Phi^\bar j$.

The action is invariant under transformations $K(\Phi, \Phi^\dagger) + \Lambda(\Phi) + \bar\Lambda(\bar\Phi)$: these are known as Kähler transformations.

Considering this theory gives an intersection of Kähler geometry with supersymmetric field theory.

By expanding the Kähler potential $K(\Phi, \bar\Phi)$ in terms of derivatives of $K$ and the constituent superfields of $\Phi, \bar\Phi$, and then eliminating the auxiliary fields $F, \bar F$ using the equations of motion, the following expression is obtained:

$$S_K = \int d^4x \left[g_{ i \bar j } (\partial_\mu \phi^i \partial^\mu \bar \phi^\bar j) + g_{i \bar j}\frac{i}{2} (\nabla_\mu \psi^i \sigma^\mu \bar \psi ^\bar j - \psi^i \sigma^\mu \nabla_\mu \bar \psi^\bar j) + \frac{1}{4}R_{i\bar j k \bar l}(\psi^i \psi^k)(\bar \psi^\bar j \bar \psi^\bar l) \right]$$

where

- $g_{i\bar j}$ is the Kähler metric. It is invariant under Kähler transformations. If the kinetic term is positive definite, then $g_{i\bar j}$ is invertible, allowing the inverse metric $g^{i\bar j}$ to be defined.
- The Christoffel symbols (adapted for a Kähler metric) are $\Gamma^i{}_{jk} = g^{i\bar l}\partial_j g_{k \bar l}$ and $\bar \Gamma^{\bar i} {} _{\bar j \bar k} = g^{l \bar i}\partial_{\bar j} g_{l \bar k}.$
- The covariant derivatives $\nabla_\mu \psi^i$ and $\nabla_\mu \bar \psi^{\bar j}$ are defined

$$\nabla_\mu \psi^i = \partial_\mu \psi^i + \Gamma ^i{}_{jk} \psi^j \partial_\mu \phi^k$$

and

$$\nabla_\mu \bar\psi^{\bar i} = \partial_\mu \psi^{\bar i} + \bar \Gamma ^{\bar i}{}_{\bar j \bar k} \bar \psi^{\bar j} \partial_\mu \bar \phi^{\bar k}$$

- The Riemann curvature tensor (adapted for a Kähler metric) is defined $R_{i\bar j k\bar l} = g_{m \bar j} \partial_{\bar l} \Gamma^m{}_{ik} = \partial_k\partial_{\bar l} g_{i \bar j} - g^{m \bar n} (\partial_k g_{i \bar n}) (\partial_{\bar l}g_{m \bar j})$.

==== Adding a superpotential ====
A superpotential $W(\Phi)$ can be added to form the more general action

$$S = S_K - \int d^4 x \left[g^{i \bar j} \partial_i W \partial_{\bar j} \bar W + \frac{1}{4}\psi^i \psi^j H_{ij}(W) + \frac{1}{4}\bar \psi^{\bar i} \bar \psi^{\bar j}H_{\bar i \bar j}(\bar W)\right]$$

where the Hessians of $W$ are defined

$$H_{ij}(W) = \nabla_i\partial_j W = \partial_i \partial_j W - \Gamma^k{}_{ij} \partial_k W$$
$$\bar H_{\bar i \bar j}(\bar W) = \nabla_{\bar i}\partial_{\bar j} \bar W = \partial_{\bar i} \partial_{\bar j} \bar W - \Gamma^{\bar k}{}_{\bar i \bar j} \partial_{\bar k} \bar W$$.

== See also ==
- N = 4 supersymmetric Yang–Mills theory
- Supermultiplet
