= Haag–Łopuszański–Sohnius theorem =

Theorem in theoretical physics

In theoretical physics, the Haag–Łopuszański–Sohnius theorem states that if both commutating and anticommutating generators are considered, then the only way to nontrivially mix spacetime and internal symmetries is through supersymmetry. The anticommutating generators must be spin-1/2 spinors which can additionally admit their own internal symmetry known as R-symmetry. The theorem is a generalization of the Coleman–Mandula theorem to Lie superalgebras. It was proved in 1975 by Rudolf Haag, Jan Łopuszański, and Martin Sohnius as a response to the development of the first supersymmetric field theories by Julius Wess and Bruno Zumino in 1974.

== History ==
During the 1960s, a set of theorems investigating how internal symmetries can be combined with spacetime symmetries were proved, with the most general being the Coleman–Mandula theorem. It showed that the Lie group symmetry of an interacting theory must necessarily be a direct product of the Poincaré group with some compact internal group. Unaware of this theorem, during the early 1970s a number of authors independently came up with supersymmetry, seemingly in contradiction to the theorem since there some generators do transform non-trivially under spacetime transformations.

In 1974 Jan Łopuszański visited Karlsruhe from Wrocław shortly after Julius Wess and Bruno Zumino constructed the first supersymmetric quantum field theory, the Wess–Zumino model. Speaking to Wess, Łopuszański was interested in figuring out how these new theories managed to overcome the Coleman–Mandula theorem. While Wess was too busy to work with Łopuszański, his doctoral student Martin Sohnius was available. Over the next few weeks they devised a proof of their theorem after which Łopuszański went to CERN where he worked with Rudolf Haag to significantly refine the argument and also extend it to the massless case. Later, after Łopuszański went back to Wrocław, Sohnius went to CERN to finish the paper with Haag, which was published in 1975.

== Theorem ==
The main assumptions of the Coleman–Mandula theorem are that the theory includes an S-matrix with analytic scattering amplitudes such that any two-particle state must undergo some reaction at almost all energies and scattering angles. Furthermore, there must only be a finite number of particle types below any mass, disqualifying massless particles. The theorem then restricts the Lie algebra of the theory to be a direct sum of the Poincare algebra with some internal symmetry algebra.

The Haag–Łopuszański–Sohnius theorem is based on the same assumptions, except for allowing additional anticommutating generators, elevating the Lie algebra to a Lie superalgebra. In four dimensions, the theorem states that the only nontrivial anticommutating generators that can be added are a set of $\mathcal N$ pairs of supercharges $Q^L_\alpha$ and $\bar Q^R_{\dot \alpha}$, indexed by $\alpha$, which commute with the momentum generator and transform as left-handed and right-handed Weyl spinors. The undotted and dotted index notation, known as Van der Waerden notation, distinguishes left-handed and right-handed Weyl spinors from each other. Generators of other spin, such spin-3/2 or higher, are disallowed by the theorem. In a basis where $(\bar Q^A_{\dot \alpha}) = (Q^A_\alpha)^\dagger$, these supercharges satisfy

$$\{Q^A_\alpha, Q^B_\beta\} = \epsilon_{\alpha \beta} Z^{AB}, \ \ \ \ \ \ \ \ \ \ \{Q^A_\alpha, \bar Q^B_{\dot \beta}\} = \delta^{AB}\sigma^\mu_{\alpha \dot \beta}P_\mu,$$

where $Z^{AB}$ are known as central charges, which commute with all generators of the superalgebra. Together with the Poincaré algebra, this Lie superalgebra is known as the super-Poincaré algebra. Since four dimensional Minkowski spacetime also admits Majorana spinors as fundamental spinor representations, the algebra can equivalently be written in terms of four-component Majorana spinor supercharges, with the algebra expressed in terms of gamma matrices and the charge conjugation operator rather than Pauli matrices used for the two-component Weyl spinors.

The supercharges can also admit an additional Lie algebra symmetry known as R-symmetry, whose generators $B_i$ satisfy

$$[Q^A_\alpha, B_i] =\sum_B s^{AB}_i Q^B_\alpha,$$

where $s_i^{AB}$ are Hermitian representation matrices of the generators in the $\mathcal N$-dimensional representation of the R-symmetry group. For $\mathcal N=1$ the central charge must vanish and the R-symmetry is given by a $\text{U}(1)$ group, while for extended supersymmetry $\mathcal N>1$ the central charges need not vanish, while the R-symmetry is a $\text{U}(\mathcal N)$ group.

If massless particles are allowed, then the algebra can additionally be extended using conformal generators: the dilaton generator $D$ and the special conformal transformations generator $K_\mu$. For $\mathcal N$ supercharges, there must also be the same number of superconformal generators $S_\alpha$ which satisfy

$$\{S^A_\alpha, \bar S^B_{\dot \beta}\} = \delta^{AB}\sigma^\mu_{\alpha \dot \beta}K_\mu,$$

with both the supercharges and the superconformal generators being charged under a $\text{U}(\mathcal N)$ R-symmetry. This algebra is an example of a superconformal algebra, which in this four dimensional case is denoted by $\mathfrak{su}(2,2|\mathcal N)$. Unlike for non-conformal supersymmetric algebras, R-symmetry is always present in superconformal algebras.

== Limitations ==
The Haag–Łopuszański–Sohnius theorem was originally derived in four dimensions, however the result that supersymmetry is the only nontrivial extension to spacetime symmetries holds in all dimensions greater than two. The form of the supersymmetry algebra however changes. Depending on the dimension, the supercharges can be Weyl, Majorana, Weyl–Majorana, or symplectic Weyl–Majorana spinors. Furthermore, R-symmetry groups differ according to the dimensionality and the number of supercharges. This superalgebra also only applies in Minkowski spacetime, being modified in other spacetimes. For example, there exists an extension to anti-de Sitter space for one or more supercharges, while an extension to de Sitter space only works if multiple supercharges are present.

In two or fewer dimensions the theorem breaks down. The reason for this is that analyticity of the scattering amplitudes can no longer hold since for example in two dimensions the only scattering is forward and backward scattering. The theorem also does not apply to discrete symmetries or to spontaneously broken symmetries since these are not symmetries at the level of the S-matrix.

== See also ==
- Supergravity
- S-matrix
