= N = 4 supersymmetric Yang–Mills theory =

Superconformal Yang–Mills theory

N = 4 supersymmetric Yang–Mills (SYM) theory is a relativistic conformally invariant Lagrangian gauge theory describing the interactions of fermions via gauge field exchanges. In D=4 spacetime dimensions, N=4 is the maximal number of supersymmetries or supersymmetry charges.

SYM theory is a toy theory based on Yang–Mills theory; it does not model the real world, but it is useful because it can act as a proving ground for approaches for attacking problems in more complex theories. It describes a universe containing boson fields and fermion fields which are related by four supersymmetries (this means that transforming bosonic and fermionic fields in a certain way leaves the theory invariant). It is one of the simplest (in the sense that it has no free parameters except for the gauge group) and one of the few ultraviolet finite quantum field theories in 4 dimensions. It can be thought of as the most symmetric field theory that does not involve gravity.

Like all supersymmetric field theories, SYM theory may equivalently be formulated as a superfield theory on an extended superspace in which the spacetime variables are augmented by a number of Grassmann variables which, for the case N=4, consist of 4 Dirac spinors, making a total of 16 independent anticommuting generators for the extended ring of superfunctions. The field equations are equivalent to the geometric condition that the supercurvature 2-form vanish identically on all super null lines. This is also known as the super-ambitwistor correspondence.

A similar super-ambitwistor characterization holds for D=10, N=1 dimensional super Yang–Mills theory, and the lower dimensional cases D=6, N=2 and D=4, N=4 may be derived from this via dimensional reduction.

== Meaning of N and numbers of fields ==
In N supersymmetric Yang–Mills theory, N denotes the number of independent supersymmetric operations that transform the spin-1 gauge field into spin-1/2 fermionic fields. In an analogy with symmetries under rotations, N would be the number of independent rotations, N = 1 in a plane, N = 2 in 3D space, etc... That is, in a N = 4 SYM theory, the gauge boson can be "rotated" into N = 4 different supersymmetric fermion partners. In turns, each fermion can be rotated into four different bosons: one corresponds to the rotation back to the spin-1 gauge field, and the three others are spin-0 boson fields. Because in 3D space one may use different rotations to reach a same point (or here the same spin-0 boson), each spin-0 boson is superpartners of two different spin-1/2 fermions, not just one. So in total, one has only 6 spin-0 bosons, not 16.

Therefore, N = 4 SYM has 1 + 4 + 6 = 11 fields, namely: one vector field (the spin-1 gauge boson), four spinor fields (the spin-1/2 fermions) and six scalar fields (the spin-0 bosons). N = 4 is the maximum number of independent supersymmetries: starting from a spin-1 field and using more supersymmetries, e.g., N = 5, only rotates between the 11 fields. To have N > 4 independent supersymmetries, one needs to start from a gauge field of spin higher than 1, e.g., a spin-2 tensor field such as that of the graviton. This is the N = 8 supergravity theory.

== Lagrangian ==
The Lagrangian for the theory is

$$L = \operatorname{tr} \left\{-\frac{1}{2g^2}F_{\mu\nu}F^{\mu\nu}+\frac{\theta_I}{8\pi^2}F_{\mu\nu}\bar{F}^{\mu\nu}- i \overline{\lambda}^a\overline{\sigma}^\mu D_\mu \lambda_a -D_\mu X^i D^\mu X^i
+g C^{ab}_i \lambda_a[X^i,\lambda_b] + g \overline{C}_{iab}\overline{\lambda}^a[X^i,\overline{\lambda}^b]+\frac{g^2}{2}[X^i,X^j]^2 \right\},$$

where $g$ and $\theta_I$ are coupling constants (specifically $g$ is the gauge coupling and $\theta_I$ is the instanton angle), the field strength is $F^k_{\mu\nu} = \partial_\mu A^k_\nu-\partial_\nu A^k_\mu+f^{klm}A^l_\mu A^m_\nu$ with $A^k_\nu$ the gauge field and indices i,j = 1, ..., 6 as well as a, b = 1, ..., 4, and $f$ represents the structure constants of the particular gauge group. The $\lambda^a$ are left Weyl fermions, $\sigma^\mu$ are the Pauli matrices, $D_\mu$ is the gauge covariant derivative, $X^i$ are real scalars, and $C_i^{ab}$ represents the structure constants of the R-symmetry group SU(4), which rotates the four supersymmetries. As a consequence of the nonrenormalization theorems, this supersymmetric field theory is in fact a superconformal field theory.

== Ten-dimensional Lagrangian ==
The above Lagrangian can be found by beginning with the simpler ten-dimensional Lagrangian

$$L = \operatorname{tr} \left\{ \frac{1}{g^2} F_{IJ} F^{IJ} - i \bar{\lambda} \Gamma^I D_I \lambda \right\},$$

where I and J are now run from 0 through 9 and $\Gamma^I$ are the 32 by 32 gamma matrices $( 32=2^{10/2} )$, followed by adding the term with $\theta_I$ which is a topological term.

The components $A_i$ of the gauge field for i = 4 to 9 become scalars upon eliminating the extra dimensions. This also gives an interpretation of the SO(6) R-symmetry as rotations in the extra compact dimensions.

By compactification on a T^{6}, all the supercharges are preserved, giving N = 4 in the 4-dimensional theory.

A Type IIB string theory interpretation of the theory is the worldvolume theory of a stack of D3-branes.

== S-duality ==
The coupling constants $\theta_I$ and $g$ naturally pair together into a single coupling constant

$$\tau := \frac{\theta_I}{2\pi}+\frac{4\pi i}{g^2}.$$

The theory has symmetries that shift $\tau$ by integers. The S-duality conjecture says there is also a symmetry which sends $\tau \mapsto \frac{-1}{n_G\tau}$ as well as switching the group $G$ to its Langlands dual group.

== AdS/CFT correspondence ==
This theory is also important in the context of the holographic principle. There is a duality between Type IIB string theory on AdS_{5} × S^{5} space (a product of 5-dimensional AdS space with a 5-dimensional sphere) and N = 4 super Yang–Mills on the 4-dimensional boundary of AdS_{5}. However, this particular realization of the AdS/CFT correspondence is not a realistic model of gravity, since gravity in our universe is 4-dimensional. Despite this, the AdS/CFT correspondence is the most successful realization of the holographic principle, a speculative idea about quantum gravity originally proposed by Gerard 't Hooft, who was expanding on work on black hole thermodynamics, and was improved and promoted in the context of string theory by Leonard Susskind.

== Integrability ==
There is evidence that N = 4 supersymmetric Yang–Mills theory has an integrable structure in the planar large N limit (see below for what "planar" means in the present context). As the number of colors (also denoted N) goes to infinity, the amplitudes scale like $N^{2-2g}$, so that only the genus 0 (planar graph) contribution survives. Planar Feynman diagrams are graphs in which no propagator cross over another one, in contrast to non-planar Feynman graphs where one or more propagator goes over another one. A non-planar graph has a smaller number of possible gauge loops compared to a similar planar graph. Non-planar graphs are thus suppressed by factors $1/N^{2-2g}$ compared to planar ones which therefore dominate in the large N limit. Consequently, a planar Yang–Mills theory denotes a theory in the large N limit, with N usually the number of colors. Likewise, a planar limit is a limit in which scattering amplitudes are dominated by Feynman diagrams which can be given the structure of planar graphs. In the large N limit, the coupling $g$ vanishes and a perturbative formalism is therefore well-suited for large N calculations. Therefore, planar graphs are associated to the domain where perturbative calculations converge well.

Beisert et al. give a review article demonstrating how in this situation local operators can be expressed via certain states in spin chains (in particular the Heisenberg spin chain), but based on a larger Lie superalgebra rather than $\mathfrak{su}(2)$ for ordinary spin. These spin chains are integrable in the sense that they can be solved by the Bethe ansatz method. They also construct an action of the associated Yangian on scattering amplitudes.

Nima Arkani-Hamed et al. have also researched this subject. Using twistor theory, they find a description (the amplituhedron formalism) in terms of the positive Grassmannian.

== Relation to 11-dimensional M-theory ==
N = 4 super Yang–Mills can be derived from a simpler 10-dimensional theory, and yet supergravity and M-theory exist in 11 dimensions. The connection is that if the gauge group U(N) of SYM becomes infinite as $N\rightarrow \infty$ it becomes equivalent to an 11-dimensional theory known as matrix theory.

== Topologically twisted N = 4 supersymmetric Yang–Mills theory ==
N = 4 supersymmetric Yang–Mills theory can be topologically twisted. Such a twist is a choice for how the four-dimensional spin group $\operatorname{Spin}(4)=\operatorname{SU}(2)\times\operatorname{SU}(2)$ acts on the canonical inclusion representation $\mathbf{4}\colon\operatorname{SU}(4)\hookrightarrow\operatorname{GL}_4(\mathbb{C})$ of the R-symmetry group, which relates the topology to the supersymmetry. Three inequivalent twists exists, which are the Donaldson–Witten twist$(\mathbf{1},\mathbf{2})\oplus(\mathbf{1},\mathbf{1})\oplus(\mathbf{1},\mathbf{1})$, the Vafa–Witten twist $(\mathbf{1},\mathbf{2})\oplus(\mathbf{1},\mathbf{2})$ and the Kapustin–Witten twist$(\mathbf{2},\mathbf{1})\oplus(\mathbf{1},\mathbf{2})$.

== See also ==
- 4D N = 1 global supersymmetry
- 6D (2,0) superconformal field theory
- Extended supersymmetry
- N = 1 supersymmetric Yang–Mills theory
- N = 8 supergravity
- Seiberg–Witten theory
