= Super Minkowski space =

Super vector space forming base superspace for supersymmetric field theories

In mathematics and physics, super Minkowski space or Minkowski superspace is a supersymmetric extension of Minkowski space, sometimes used as the base manifold (or rather, supermanifold) for superfields. It is acted on by the super Poincaré algebra.

== Construction ==
=== Abstract construction ===
Abstractly, super Minkowski space is the space of (right) cosets within the Super Poincaré group of Lorentz group, that is,

$$\text{Super Minkowski space} \cong \frac{\text{Super Poincaré group}}{\text{Lorentz group}}$$.

This is analogous to the way ordinary Minkowski spacetime can be identified with the (right) cosets within the Poincaré group of the Lorentz group, that is,

$$\text{Minkowski space} \cong \frac{\text{Poincaré group}}{\text{Lorentz group}}$$.

The coset space is naturally affine, and the nilpotent, anti-commuting behavior of the fermionic directions arises naturally from the Clifford algebra associated with the Lorentz group.

=== Direct sum construction ===
For this section, the dimension of the Minkowski space under consideration is $d = 4$.

Super Minkowski space can be concretely realized as the direct sum of Minkowski space, which has coordinates $x^\mu$, with 'spin space'. The dimension of 'spin space' depends on the number $\mathcal{N}$ of supercharges in the associated super Poincaré algebra to the super Minkowski space under consideration. In the simplest case, $\mathcal{N} = 1$, the 'spin space' has 'spin coordinates' $(\theta_\alpha, \bar\theta^\dot\alpha)$ with $\alpha, \dot\alpha = 1,2$, where each component is a Grassmann number. In total this forms 4 spin coordinates.

The notation for $\mathcal{N} = 1$ super Minkowski space is then $\mathbb{R}^{4|4}$.

There are theories which admit $\mathcal{N}$ supercharges. Such cases have extended supersymmetry. For such theories, super Minkowski space is labelled $\mathbb{R}^{4|4\mathcal{N}}$, with coordinates $(\theta^I_\alpha, \bar\theta^{J\dot\alpha})$ with $I, J = 1, \cdots , \mathcal{N}$.

== Definition ==
The underlying supermanifold of super Minkowski space is isomorphic to a super vector space given by the direct sum of ordinary Minkowski spacetime in d dimensions (often taken to be 4) and a number $\mathcal{N}$ of real spinor representations of the Lorentz algebra. (When $d \equiv 2 \mod 4$ this is slightly ambiguous because there are 2 different real spin representations, so one needs to replace $\mathcal{N}$ by a pair of integers $(\mathcal{N}_1, \mathcal{N}_2)$, though some authors use a different convention and take $\mathcal{N}$ copies of both spin representations.)

However this construction is misleading for two reasons: first, super Minkowski space is really an affine space over a group rather than a group, or in other words it has no distinguished "origin", and second, the underlying supergroup of translations is not a super vector space but a nilpotent supergroup of nilpotent length 2.

This supergroup has the following Lie superalgebra. Suppose that $M$ is Minkowski space (of dimension $d$), and $S$ is a finite sum of irreducible real spinor representations for $d$-dimensional Minkowski space.

Then there is an invariant, symmetric bilinear map $[\cdot,\cdot]: S\times S \rightarrow M$. It is positive definite in the sense that, for any $s$, the element $[s, s]$ is in the closed positive cone of $M$, and $[s,s]\neq 0$ if $s \neq 0$. This bilinear map is unique up to isomorphism.

The Lie superalgebra $\mathfrak{g} = \mathfrak{g_0}\oplus \mathfrak{g_1} = M \oplus S$ has $M$ as its even part, and $S$ as its odd (fermionic) part. The invariant bilinear map $[\cdot,\cdot]$ is extended to the whole superalgebra to define the (graded) Lie bracket $[\cdot,\cdot]:\mathfrak{g}\times\mathfrak{g} \rightarrow \mathfrak{g}$, where the Lie bracket of anything in $M$ with anything is zero.

The dimensions of the irreducible real spinor representation(s) for various dimensions d of spacetime are given a table below. The table also displays the type of reality structure for the spinor representation, and the type of invariant bilinear form on the spinor representation.

Spacetime dimension, d	Real dimension of spinor representation(s)	Structure	Bilinear form
1	1	Real	Symmetric
2	1, 1	Real	Two dual representations
3	2	Real	Alternating
4	4	Complex (dimension 2)	Alternating
5	8	Quaternionic (dimension 2)	Symmetric
6	8, 8	Quaternionic (dimension 2, 2)	Two dual representations
7	16	Quaternionic (dimension 4)	Alternating
8	16	Complex (dimension 8)	Symmetric
9	16	Real	Symmetric
10	16, 16	Real	Two dual representations
11	32	Real	Alternating
12	64	Complex (dimension 32)	Alternating

The table repeats whenever the dimension increases by 8, except that the dimensions of the spin representations are multiplied by 16.

== Notation ==
In the physics literature, a super Minkowski spacetime is often specified by giving the dimension $d$ of the even, bosonic part (dimension of the spacetime), and the number of times $\mathcal{N}$ that each irreducible spinor representation occurs in the odd, fermionic part. This $\mathcal{N}$ is the number of supercharges in the associated super Poincaré algebra to the super Minkowski space.

In mathematics, Minkowski spacetime is sometimes specified in the form M^{m|n} or $\mathbb{R}^{m|n}$ where m is the dimension of the even part and n the dimension of the odd part. This is notation used for $\mathbb{Z}_2$-graded vector spaces. The notation can be extended to include the signature of the underlying spacetime, often this is $\mathbb{R}^{1,d-1|n}$ if $m = d$.

The relation is as follows: the integer $d$ in the physics notation is the integer $m$ in the mathematics notation, while the integer $n$ in the mathematics notation is $D$ times the integer $\mathcal{N}$ in the physics notation, where $D$ is the dimension of (either of) the irreducible real spinor representation(s). For example, the $d = 4, \mathcal{N} = 1$ Minkowski spacetime is $\mathbb{R}^{4|4}$. A general expression is then $\mathbb{R}^{p,q|D\mathcal{N}}$.

When $d \equiv 2 \mod 4$, there are two different irreducible real spinor representations, and authors use various different conventions. Using earlier notation, if there are $\mathcal{N}_1$ copies of the one representation and $\mathcal{N}_2$ of the other, then defining $\mathcal{N} = \mathcal{N}_1 + \mathcal{N}_2$, the earlier expression holds.

In physics the letter P is used for a basis of the even bosonic part of the Lie superalgebra, and the letter Q is often used for a basis of the complexification of the odd fermionic part, so in particular the structure constants of the Lie superalgebra may be complex rather than real. Often the basis elements Q come in complex conjugate pairs, so the real subspace can be recovered as the fixed points of complex conjugation.

== Signature (p,q) ==
The real dimension associated to the factor $\mathcal{N}$ or $(\mathcal{N}_1, \mathcal{N_2})$ can be found for generalized Minkowski space with dimension $n$ and arbitrary signature $(p,q)$. The earlier subtlety when $d \equiv 2 \mod 4$ instead becomes a subtlety when $p - q \equiv 0 \mod 4$. For the rest of this section, the signature refers to the difference $p - q$.

The dimension depends on the reality structure on the spin representation. This is dependent on the signature $p - q$ modulo 8, given by the table

p−q mod 8	0	1	2	3	4	5	6	7
Structure	$\mathbb{R} + \mathbb{R}$	$\mathbb{R}$	$\mathbb{C}$	$\mathbb{H}$	$\mathbb{H} + \mathbb{H}$	$\mathbb{H}$	$\mathbb{C}$	$\mathbb{R}$

The dimension also depends on $n$. We can write $n$ as either $2m$ or $2m + 1$, where $m := \lfloor n/2 \rfloor$. We define the spin representation $S$ to be the representation constructed using the exterior algebra of some vector space, as described here. The complex dimension of $S$ is $2^m$. If the signature is even, then this splits into two irreducible half-spin representations $S_+$ and $S_-$ of dimension $2^{m-1}$, while if the signature is odd, then $S$ is itself irreducible. When the signature is even, there is the extra subtlety that if the signature is a multiple of 4 then these half-spin representations are inequivalent, otherwise they are equivalent.

Then if the signature is odd, $\mathcal{N}$ counts the number of copies of the spin representation $S$. If the signature is even and not a multiple of 4, $\mathcal{N}$ counts the number of copies of the half-spin representation. If the signature is a multiple of 4, then $(\mathcal{N}_1, \mathcal{N}_2)$ counts the number of copies of each half-spin representation.

Then, if the reality structure is real, then the complex dimension becomes the real dimension. On the other hand if the reality structure is quaternionic or complex (hermitian), the real dimension is double the complex dimension.

The real dimension associated to $\mathcal{N}$ or $(\mathcal{N}_1, \mathcal{N}_2)$ is summarized in the following table:

p−q mod 8	0	1	2	3	4	5	6	7
Real dimension $D$	$2^{m-1}, 2^{m-1}$	$2^{m}$	$2^{m}$	$2^{m+1}$	$2^{m}, 2^{m}$	$2^{m+1}$	$2^{m}$	$2^{m}$

This allows the calculation of the dimension of superspace with underlying spacetime $\mathbb{R}^{p,q}$ with $\mathcal{N}$ supercharges, or $(\mathcal{N}_1, \mathcal{N_2})$ supercharges when the signature is a multiple of 4. The associated super vector space is $\mathbb{R}^{p,q|\mathcal{N}D}$ with $\mathcal{N} = \mathcal{N}_1 + \mathcal{N}_2$ where appropriate.

== Restrictions on dimensions and supercharges ==
=== Higher-spin theory ===
There is an upper bound on $\mathcal{N}$ (equal to $\mathcal{N}_1 + \mathcal{N}_2$ where appropriate). More straightforwardly there is an upper bound on the dimension of the spin space $N = \mathcal{N}D$ where $D$ is the dimension of the spin representation if the signature is odd, and the dimension of the half-spin representation if the signature is even. The bound is $N = 32$.

This bound arises as any theory with more than $N = 32$ supercharges automatically has fields with (absolute value of) spin greater than 2. More mathematically, any representation of the superalgebra contains fields with spin greater than 2. Theories that consider such fields are known as higher-spin theories. On Minkowski space, there are no-go theorems which prohibit such theories from being interesting.

If one doesn't wish to consider such theories, this gives upper bounds on the dimension and on $\mathcal{N}$. For Lorentzian spaces (with signature $(-, +, \cdots, +)$), the limit on dimension is $d < 12$. For generalized Minkowski spaces of arbitrary signature, the upper dimension depends sensitively on the signature, as detailed in an earlier section.

=== Supergravity ===
A large number of supercharges $N$ also implies local supersymmetry. If supersymmetries are gauge symmetries of the theory, then since the supercharges can be used to generate translations, this implies infinitesimal translations are gauge symmetries of the theory. But these generate local diffeomorphisms, which is a signature of gravitational theories. So any theory with local supersymmetry is necessarily a supergravity theory.

The limit placed on massless representations is the highest spin field must have spin $|h| \leq 1$, which places a limit of $N = 16$ supercharges for theories without supergravity.

=== Supersymmetric Yang-Mills theories ===
These are theories consisting of a gauge superfield partnered with a spinor superfield. This requires a matching of degrees of freedom. If we restrict this discussion to $d$-dimensional Lorentzian space, the degrees of freedom of the gauge field is $d - 2$, while the degrees of freedom of a spinor is a power of 2, which can be worked out from information elsewhere in this article. This places restrictions on super Minkowski spaces which can support a supersymmetric Yang-Mills theory. For example, for $\mathcal{N} = 1$, only $d = 3, 4, 6$ or $10$ support a Yang-Mills theory.

== See also ==
- Superspace
- Super vector space
- Super-Poincaré algebra
