= R-symmetry =

Property of supersymmetric models in theoretical physics

In theoretical physics, an R-symmetry is an internal symmetry present in some supersymmetric theories. It is often described as a symmetry which "rotates the supercharges", meaning that it commutes with the generators of spacetime symmetries (i.e. those of the Poincaré algebra in flat spacetime) but not with the supersymmetry generators.

The group of R-symmetry transformations is highly constrained by the spacetime symmetry and the structure of the spin representation in which the supersymmetry generators transform. For Poincaré-invariant theories in four spacetime dimensions, this group is determined by the Haag–Łopuszański–Sohnius theorem: for minimal supersymmetry, this R-symmetry group is $\operatorname{U}(1)$; for theories with $\mathcal{N}$-extended supersymmetry, it is the non-abelian group $\operatorname{U}(\mathcal{N})$; in the special case of $\mathcal{N}=4$, it may also be $\operatorname{SU}(4)$.

A theory which is supersymmetric need not possess R-symmetry, and R-symmetry may be broken at the quantum level even where it is present classically, i.e. the symmetry may be anomalous. Both of these aspects are exhibited by the Wess-Zumino model, which is only invariant under R-symmetry when the superpotential is monomial, and the R-symmetry is always anomalous. A theory may only be invariant under a subgroup of the R-symmetry; for example, the minimal Supersymmetric Standard Model has only R-parity, i.e. invariance under the discrete $\mathbb{Z}_2$ subgroup of $\operatorname{U}(1)$.

== History and terminology ==
In 1974, Wess and Zumino introduced their aforementioned model in which a $\gamma_5$ transformation appears in the commutator of two supersymmetry transformations. More realistic models with such a symmetry were introduced in 1975 by Salam and Strathdee and by Fayet, with the latter using the notation "$R$" for the associated tranformation. Parallel to this, Haag, Łopuszański, Sohnius and Dondi showed that in the $\mathcal{N}$-extended case, the internal symmetry group acting on the supercharges is enlarged to include $\operatorname{SU}(\mathcal{N})$. The term "R-invariance" was used in early instances, but "R-symmetry" was in use by at least 1978.

Fayet later showed that in physically realistic models, in which the superpartners of known particles must be very massive, the $\operatorname{U}(1)$ R-symmetry must be broken to the $\mathbb{Z}_2$ subgroup (R-parity) to allow the gluinos and gravitino to acquire mass. The minimal supersymmetric standard model therefore does not possess R-symmetry, but only R-parity.

== Relation to supersymmetry algebras ==
The R-symmetry group can be considered as a group of (external) automorphisms of the Poincaré superalgebra, and its Lie algebra is contained in more general supersymmetry algebras.

A model invariant under both supersymmetry and conformal transformations (such as the massless Wess-Zumino model) must also be R-invariant because the closure of the superconformal algebra requires R-symmetry terms in the odd-odd brackets.

== Gauged R-symmetry ==
In rigid supersymmetric theories, any R-symmetry is global and cannot be gauged. However, in supergravity theories, in which the supersymmetry is local, R-symmetry can be gauged, though this has to be achieved by "mixing" it with another global symmetry group.

== Other dimensions and signatures ==
The definition of the R-symmetry group depends on the reality structure of the spinor representation, hence it varies with dimension and signature. The R-symmetry group is always isomorphic to a classical Lie group or a product of two such groups.

In Lorentzian signature, we have the following. In dimensions 2, 6 and 10, where the reality condition is Weyl-compatible, there are two inequivalent real spinor modules distinguished by chirality, and the amount of supersymmetry is characterised by a pair of integers $(N_+,N_-)$ indicating the number of left- and right-handed sets of supercharges.

R-symmetry groups in Lorentzian signature
Spacetime dimension	Spinor type	R-symmetry group
2	Majorana-Weyl	$\operatorname{SO}(\mathcal{N}_+)\times\operatorname{SO}(\mathcal{N}_-)$
3	Majorana	$\operatorname{SO}(\mathcal{N})$
4	Majorana	$\operatorname{U}(\mathcal{N})$
5	Symplectic Majorana	$\operatorname{USp}(2\mathcal{N})$
6	Symplectic Majorana-Weyl	$\operatorname{USp}(2\mathcal{N}_+)\times\operatorname{USp}(2\mathcal{N}_-)$
7	Symplectic Majorana	$\operatorname{USp}(2\mathcal{N})$
8	Majorana	$\operatorname{U}(\mathcal{N})$
9	Majorana	$\operatorname{SO}(\mathcal{N})$
10	Majorana-Weyl	$\operatorname{SO}(\mathcal{N}_+)\times\operatorname{SO}(\mathcal{N}_-)$

Theories with extended supersymmetry generally have a number of scalar fields described by a sigma model, meaning that they can be considered as being coordinates on an abstract homogeneous Riemannian manifold. The R-symmetry can be identified as part of the isotropy of this "scalar manifold", which in turn is often viewed as the internal geometry in a compactification from a higher-dimensional theory (usually string theory or M-theory).

With more general signature or with non-standard choices of squaring map (or equivalently "twisted" reality conditions on spinors) there are more possibilities for the R-symmetry group. They are relevant to the study of time-like T-duality.
