= Supersymmetry algebras in 1 + 1 dimensions =

A two dimensional Minkowski space, i.e. a flat space with one time and one spatial dimension, has a two-dimensional Poincaré group IO(1,1) as its symmetry group. The respective Lie algebra is called the Poincaré algebra. It is possible to extend this algebra to a supersymmetry algebra, which is a $\mathbb{Z}_2$-graded Lie superalgebra. The most common ways to do this are discussed below.

== N=(2,2) algebra ==
Let the Lie algebra of IO(1,1) be generated by the following generators:

- $H = P_0$ is the generator of the time translation,
- $P = P_1$ is the generator of the space translation,
- $M = M_{01}$ is the generator of Lorentz boosts.

For the commutators between these generators, see Poincaré algebra.

The $\mathcal{N}=(2,2)$ supersymmetry algebra over this space is a supersymmetric extension of this Lie algebra with the four additional generators (supercharges) $Q_+, \, Q_-, \, \overline{Q}_+, \, \overline{Q}_-$, which are odd elements of the Lie superalgebra. Under Lorentz transformations the generators $Q_+$ and $\overline{Q}_+$ transform as left-handed Weyl spinors, while $Q_-$ and $\overline{Q}_-$ transform as right-handed Weyl spinors. The algebra is given by the Poincaré algebra plus

$$\begin{align}
&\begin{align}
&Q_+^2 = Q_{-}^2 = \overline{Q}_+^2 = \overline{Q}_-^2 =0, \\
&\{ Q_{\pm}, \overline{Q}_{\pm} \} = H \pm P, \\
\end{align} \\
&\begin{align}
&\{\overline{Q}_+, \overline{Q}_- \} = Z, && \{Q_+, Q_- \} = Z^*, \\
&\{Q_-, \overline{Q}_+ \} =\tilde{Z}, && \{Q_+, \overline{Q}_-\} = \tilde{Z}^*,\\
&{[iM, Q_{\pm}]} = \mp Q_{\pm}, && {[iM, \overline{Q}_{\pm}]} = \mp \overline{Q}_{\pm},
\end{align}
\end{align}$$

where all remaining commutators vanish, and $Z$ and $\tilde{Z}$ are complex central charges. The supercharges are related via $Q_{\pm}^\dagger = \overline{Q}_\pm$. $H$, $P$, and $M$ are Hermitian.

== Subalgebras of the N=(2,2) algebra ==
=== The N=(0,2) and N=(2,0) subalgebras ===
The $\mathcal{N} = (0,2)$ subalgebra is obtained from the $\mathcal{N} = (2,2)$ algebra by removing the generators $Q_-$ and $\overline{Q}_-$. Thus its anti-commutation relations are given by

$$\begin{align}
&Q_+^2 = \overline{Q}_+^2 = 0, \\
&\{ Q_{+}, \overline{Q}_{+} \} = H + P \\
\end{align}$$

plus the commutation relations above that do not involve $Q_-$ or $\overline{Q}_-$. Both generators are left-handed Weyl spinors.

Similarly, the $\mathcal{N} = (2,0)$ subalgebra is obtained by removing $Q_+$ and $\overline{Q}_+$ and fulfills

$$\begin{align}
&Q_-^2 = \overline{Q}_-^2 = 0, \\
&\{ Q_{-}, \overline{Q}_{-} \} = H - P. \\
\end{align}$$

Both supercharge generators are right-handed.

=== The N=(1,1) subalgebra ===
The $\mathcal{N} = (1,1)$ subalgebra is generated by two generators $Q_+^1$ and $Q_-^1$ given by

$$\begin{align}
Q^1_{\pm} = e^{i \nu_{\pm}} Q_{\pm} + e^{-i \nu_{\pm}} \overline{Q}_{\pm}
\end{align}$$
for two real numbers $\nu_+$and $\nu_-$.

By definition, both supercharges are real, i.e. $(Q_{\pm}^1)^\dagger = Q^1_\pm$. They transform as Majorana-Weyl spinors under Lorentz transformations. Their anti-commutation relations are given by

$$\begin{align}
&\{ Q^1_{\pm}, Q^1_{\pm} \} = 2 (H \pm P), \\
&\{ Q^1_{+}, Q^1_{-} \} = Z^1,
\end{align}$$

where $Z^1$ is a real central charge.

=== The N=(0,1) and N=(1,0) subalgebras ===
These algebras can be obtained from the $\mathcal{N} = (1,1)$ subalgebra by removing $Q_-^1$ resp. $Q_+^1$from the generators.

== See also ==
- Supersymmetry
- Super-Poincaré algebra (in 1+3 dimensions)
