= Thirring =

Thirring may refer to:

- Hans Thirring (1888–1976), Austrian physicist (father of Walter Thirring) who introduced the
  - Lense–Thirring precession, a relativistic correction to the precession of a gyroscope
- Walter Thirring (1927–2014), Austrian physicist (son of Hans Thirring) who introduced the
  - Thirring model, describing the self-interactions of a Dirac field in two dimension
  - Thirring–Wess model, describing the interaction of a Dirac field with a vector field in dimension two
