= Supersymmetry algebra =

In theoretical physics, a supersymmetry algebra (or SUSY algebra) is a mathematical formalism for describing the relation between bosons and fermions. The supersymmetry algebra contains not only the Poincaré algebra and a compact subalgebra of internal symmetries, but also contains some fermionic supercharges, transforming as a sum of $\mathcal{N}$ real spinor representations of the Poincaré group. Such symmetries are allowed by the Haag–Łopuszański–Sohnius theorem. When $\mathcal{N}>1$ the algebra is said to have extended supersymmetry. The supersymmetry algebra is a semidirect sum of a central extension of the super-Poincaré algebra by a compact Lie algebra $B$ of internal symmetries.

Bosonic fields commute while fermionic fields anticommute. In order to have a transformation that relates the two kinds of fields, the introduction of a $\mathbb{Z}_2$-grading under which the even elements are bosonic and the odd elements are fermionic is required. Such an algebra is called a Lie superalgebra.

Just as one can have representations of a Lie algebra, one can also have representations of a Lie superalgebra, called supermultiplets. For each Lie algebra, there exists an associated Lie group which is connected and simply connected, unique up to isomorphism, and the representations of the algebra can be extended to create group representations. In the same way, representations of a Lie superalgebra can sometimes be extended into representations of a Lie supergroup.

== Structure of a supersymmetry algebra ==
The general supersymmetry algebra for spacetime dimension $d$, and with the fermionic piece $Q$ consisting of a sum of $\mathcal{N}$ irreducible real spinor representations, takes the form
$$(P\oplus Z) \oplus Q \oplus (L\oplus B)$$
as a vector space, where

- $P$ is a bosonic abelian ideal subalgebra of dimension $d$, normally identified with translations of spacetime. Under the adjoint representation of the superalgebra, is the vector representation of $L$.
- $Z$ is also a bosonic abelian ideal contained in the center of the superalgebra whose elements are called central charges. As a representation of $L$, it is scalar.
- $Q$ is the fermionic subspace, and is a sum of $\mathcal{N}$ real spinor representations of $L$. The elements of $Q$ are called supercharges. The subalgebra $(P\oplus Z)\oplus Q$ is sometimes also called the supersymmetry algebra and is nilpotent of length at most 2, with the Lie bracket of two supercharges lying in $P\oplus Z$.
- $L$ is a bosonic subalgebra, isomorphic to the Lorentz algebra in $d$ dimensions, of dimension $d(d-1)/2$.
- $B$ is a bosonic subalgebra, given by the Lie algebra of some compact group, called the group of internal symmetries or R-symmetry group. It commutes with $P$, $Z$, and $L$ (and is thus scalar), but may act non-trivially on the supercharges $Q$.

The terms "bosonic" and "fermionic" refer to even and odd subspaces of the superalgebra.

The number $\mathcal{N}$ is the number of irreducible real spin representations. When the signature of spacetime is divisible by 4 this is ambiguous as in this case there are two different irreducible real spinor representations, and the number $\mathcal{N}$ is sometimes replaced by a pair of integers $(\mathcal{N}_1,\mathcal{N}_2)$.

The supersymmetry algebra is sometimes regarded as a real superalgebra (as it is above), and sometimes as a complex algebra with a hermitian conjugation. These two views are essentially equivalent, as the real algebra can be constructed from the complex algebra by taking the skew-Hermitian elements, and the complex algebra can be constructed from the real one by taking tensor product with the complex numbers.

The bosonic part of the superalgebra is isomorphic to the direct sum of the Poincaré algebra $P\rtimes L$ with the algebra $Z\oplus B$ of internal symmetries.

The subspace $(P\oplus Z)\oplus Q \oplus L$ is a central extension of the super-Poincaré algebra by $Z$; when $Z$ is trivial, it is the super-Poincaré algebra itself.

Further enlarging the algebra by the inclusion of dilatations and special conformal transformations yields a superconformal algebra.

== See also ==
- Adinkra symbols
- Super-Poincaré algebra
- Superconformal algebra
- Supersymmetry algebras in 1 + 1 dimensions
- N = 2 superconformal algebra
