= Logarithmic conformal field theory =

Conformal field theory with logarithmic short distance behavior

In theoretical physics, a logarithmic conformal field theory (LCFT) is a conformal field theory in which the correlators of the basic fields are allowed to be logarithmic at short distance, instead of being powers of the fields' distance. Equivalently, the dilation operator is not diagonalizable.

Examples of logarithmic conformal field theories include critical percolation.

== In two dimensions ==
Just like conformal field theory in general, logarithmic conformal field theory has been particularly well-studied in two dimensions. Some two-dimensional logarithmic CFTs have been solved:

- The Gaberdiel–Kausch CFT at central charge $c=-2$, which is rational with respect to its extended symmetry algebra, namely the triplet algebra.
- The $GL(1|1)$ Wess–Zumino–Witten model, based on the simplest non-trivial supergroup.
- The triplet model at $c=0$ is also rational with respect to the triplet algebra.
- Extensions to non-equilibrium dynamics (one time dimension) in statistical physics have also been considered.
