= Wess–Zumino–Witten model =

Type of 2D conformal field theory

In theoretical physics and mathematics, a Wess–Zumino–Witten (WZW) model, also called a Wess–Zumino–Novikov–Witten model, is a type of two-dimensional conformal field theory named after Julius Wess, Bruno Zumino, Sergei Novikov and Edward Witten. A WZW model is associated to a Lie group (or supergroup), and its symmetry algebra is the affine Lie algebra built from the corresponding Lie algebra (or Lie superalgebra). By extension, the name WZW model is sometimes used for any conformal field theory whose symmetry algebra is an affine Lie algebra.

== Action ==
=== Definition ===
For $\Sigma$ a Riemann surface, $G$ a Lie group, and $k$ a (generally complex) number, let us define the $G$-WZW model on $\Sigma$ at the level $k$. The model is a nonlinear sigma model whose action is a functional of a field $\gamma:\Sigma \to G$:

$$S_k(\gamma)= -\frac{k}{8\pi} \int_{\Sigma} d^2x\, \mathcal{K} \left (\gamma^{-1} \partial^\mu \gamma, \gamma^{-1} \partial_\mu \gamma \right ) + 2\pi k S^{\mathrm WZ}(\gamma).$$

Here, $\Sigma$ is equipped with a flat Euclidean metric, $\partial_\mu$ is the partial derivative, and $\mathcal{K}$ is the Killing form on the Lie algebra of $G$. The Wess–Zumino term of the action is

$$S^{\mathrm WZ}(\gamma) = -\frac{1}{48\pi^2} \int_{\mathbf{B}^3} d^3y\, \epsilon^{ijk} \mathcal{K} \left( \gamma^{-1} \partial_i \gamma, \left[\gamma^{-1} \partial_j \gamma, \gamma^{-1} \partial_k \gamma \right]\right).$$

Here $\epsilon^{ijk}$ is the completely anti-symmetric tensor, and $[.,.]$ is the Lie bracket. The Wess–Zumino term is an integral over a three-dimensional manifold $\mathbf{B}^3$ whose boundary is $\partial \mathbf{B}^3 = \Sigma$.

=== Topological properties of the Wess–Zumino term ===
For the Wess–Zumino term to make sense, we need the field $\gamma$ to have an extension to $\mathbf{B}^3$. This requires the homotopy group $\pi_2(G)$ to be trivial, which is the case in particular for any compact Lie group $G$.

The extension of a given $\gamma:\Sigma \to G$ to $\mathbf{B}^3$ is in general not unique. For the WZW model to be well-defined, $e^{iS_k(\gamma)}$ should not depend on the choice of the extension. The Wess–Zumino term is invariant under small deformations of $\gamma$, and only depends on its homotopy class. Possible homotopy classes are controlled by the homotopy group $\pi_3(G)$.

For any compact, connected simple Lie group $G$, we have $\pi_3(G)=\mathbb{Z}$, and different extensions of $\gamma$ lead to values of $S^{\mathrm WZ}(\gamma)$ that differ by integers. Therefore, they lead to the same value of $e^{iS_k(\gamma)}$ provided the level obeys

$$k \in \mathbb{Z}.$$

Integer values of the level also play an important role in the representation theory of the model's symmetry algebra, which is an affine Lie algebra. If the level is a positive integer, the affine Lie algebra has unitary highest weight representations with highest weights that are dominant integral. Such representations decompose into finite-dimensional subrepresentations with respect to the subalgebras spanned by each simple root, the corresponding negative root and their commutator, which is a Cartan generator.

In the case of the noncompact simple Lie group $\mathrm{SL}(2,\R)$, the homotopy group $\pi_3(\mathrm{SL}(2,\R))$ is trivial, and the level is not constrained to be an integer.

=== Geometrical interpretation of the Wess–Zumino term ===
If e_{a} are the basis vectors for the Lie algebra, then $\mathcal{K} (e_a, [e_b, e_c])$ are the structure constants of the Lie algebra. The structure constants are completely anti-symmetric, and thus they define a 3-form on the group manifold of G. Thus, the integrand above is just the pullback of the harmonic 3-form to the ball $\mathbf{B}^3.$ Denoting the harmonic 3-form by c and the pullback by $\gamma^*,$ one then has

$$S^{\mathrm WZ}(\gamma) = \int_{\mathbf{B}^3} \gamma^{*} c.$$

This form leads directly to a topological analysis of the WZ term.

Geometrically, this term describes the torsion of the respective manifold. The presence of this torsion compels teleparallelism of the manifold, and thus trivialization of the torsionful curvature tensor; and hence arrest of the renormalization flow, an infrared fixed point of the renormalization group, a phenomenon termed geometrostasis.

== Symmetry algebra ==
=== Generalised group symmetry ===
The Wess–Zumino–Witten model is not only symmetric under global transformations by a group element in $G$, but also has a much richer symmetry. This symmetry is often called the $G(z) \times G(\bar{z})$ symmetry. Namely, given any holomorphic $G$-valued function $\Omega(z)$, and any other (completely independent of $\Omega(z)$) antiholomorphic $G$-valued function $\bar{\Omega}(\bar{z})$, where we have identified $z=x+iy$ and $\bar{z} = x-iy$ in terms of the Euclidean space coordinates $x,y$, the following symmetry holds:

$$S_k (\gamma) = S_k (\Omega \gamma \bar{\Omega}^{-1} )$$

One way to prove the existence of this symmetry is through repeated application of the Polyakov–Wiegmann identity regarding products of $G$-valued fields:

$$S_k (\alpha \beta^{-1}) = S_k(\alpha) + S_k(\beta^{-1}) + \frac{k}{16\pi^2}\int d^2 x \textrm{Tr}(\alpha^{-1} \partial_{\bar{z}} \alpha \beta^{-1} \partial_{z} \beta)$$

The holomorphic and anti-holomorphic currents $J(z) = - \frac{1}{2}k (\partial_z \gamma) \gamma^{-1}$ and $\bar{J}(\bar{z}) = - \frac{1}{2} k \gamma^{-1} \partial_{\bar{z}} \gamma$ are the conserved currents associated with this symmetry. The singular behaviour of the products of these currents with other quantum fields determine how those fields transform under infinitesimal actions of the $G(z) \times G(\bar{z})$ group.

=== Affine Lie algebra ===
Let $z$ be a local complex coordinate on $\Sigma$, $\{t^a\}$ an orthonormal basis (with respect to the Killing form) of the Lie algebra of $G$, and $J^a(z)$ the quantization of the field $\mathcal{K}(t^a,\partial_z g g^{-1})$. We have the following operator product expansion:

$$J^a(z) J^b(w) = \frac{k\delta^{ab}}{(z - w)^2} + \frac{i f^{ab}_c J^c(w)}{z - w} + \mathcal{O}(1),$$

where $f^{ab}_c$ are the coefficients such that $[t^a,t^b] = f^{ab}_c t^c$. Equivalently, if $J^a(z)$ is expanded in modes

$$J^a(z)  = \sum_{n \in \mathbb{Z}} J_n^a z^{-n-1},$$

then the current algebra generated by $\{J_n^a\}$ is the affine Lie algebra associated to the Lie algebra of $G$, with a level that coincides with the level $k$ of the WZW model. If $\mathfrak{g}=\mathrm{Lie}(G)$, the notation for the affine Lie algebra is $\hat{\mathfrak{g}}_k$. The commutation relations of the affine Lie algebra are

$$[J^a_n,J^b_m] = f^{ab}_c J^c_{m+n} + kn\delta^{ab}\delta_{n+m,0}.$$

This affine Lie algebra is the chiral symmetry algebra associated to the left-moving currents $\mathcal{K}(t^a,\partial_z g g^{-1})$. A second copy of the same affine Lie algebra is associated to the right-moving currents $\mathcal{K}(t^a, g^{-1}\partial_{\bar z} g)$. The generators $\bar J^a(z)$ of that second copy are antiholomorphic. The full symmetry algebra of the WZW model is the product of the two copies of the affine Lie algebra.

=== Sugawara construction ===
The Sugawara construction is an embedding of the Virasoro algebra into the universal enveloping algebra of the affine Lie algebra. The existence of the embedding shows that WZW models are conformal field theories. Moreover, it leads to Knizhnik–Zamolodchikov equations for correlation functions.

The Sugawara construction is most concisely written at the level of the currents: $J^a(z)$ for the affine Lie algebra, and the energy-momentum tensor $T(z)$ for the Virasoro algebra:

$$T(z) = \frac{1}{2(k + h^{\vee})} \sum_a : J^a J^a : (z),$$

where the $:$ denotes normal ordering, and $h^{\vee}$ is the dual Coxeter number. By using the OPE of the currents and a version of Wick's theorem one may deduce that the OPE of $T(z)$ with itself is given by

$$T(y)T(z) = \frac{\frac{c}{2}}{(y-z)^4} + \frac{2T(z)}{(y-z)^2} + \frac{\partial T(z)}{y-z} + \mathcal{O}(1),$$

which is equivalent to the Virasoro algebra's commutation relations. The central charge of the Virasoro algebra is given in terms of the level $k$ of the affine Lie algebra by

$$c = \frac{k\mathrm{dim}(\mathfrak{g})}{k + h^{\vee}}.$$

At the level of the generators of the affine Lie algebra, the Sugawara construction reads

$$L_{n\neq 0} = \frac{1}{2(k + h^{\vee})} \sum_a \sum_{m\in\mathbb{Z}} J^a_{n-m} J^a_m,$$
$$L_0 = \frac{1}{2(k + h^{\vee})} \left(2\sum_a \sum_{m=1}^\infty J^a_{-m}J^a_m + J^0_aJ^0_a\right).$$

where the generators $L_n$ of the Virasoro algebra are the modes of the energy-momentum tensor, $T(z) = \sum_{n\in\mathbb{Z}} L_nz^{-n-2}$.

== Spectrum ==
=== WZW models with compact, simply connected groups ===
If the Lie group $G$ is compact and simply connected, then the WZW model is rational and diagonal: rational because the spectrum is built from a (level-dependent) finite set of irreducible representations of the affine Lie algebra called the integrable highest weight representations, and diagonal because a representation of the left-moving algebra is coupled with the same representation of the right-moving algebra.

For example, the spectrum of the $SU(2)$ WZW model at level $k\in\mathbb{N}$ is

$$\mathcal{S}_k = \bigoplus_{j=0,\frac12,1,\dots, \frac{k}{2}} \mathcal{R}_j\otimes \bar{\mathcal{R}}_j\ ,$$

where $\mathcal{R}_j$ is the affine highest weight representation of spin $j$: a representation generated by a state $|v\rangle$ such that

$$J^a_{n<0}|v\rangle = J^-_0|v\rangle=0\ ,$$

where $J^-$ is the current that corresponds to a generator $t^-$ of the Lie algebra of $SU(2)$.

=== WZW models with other types of groups ===
If the group $G$ is compact but not simply connected, the WZW model is rational but not necessarily diagonal. For example, the $SO(3)$ WZW model exists for even integer levels $k\in 2\mathbb{N}$, and its spectrum is a non-diagonal combination of finitely many integrable highest weight representations.

If the group $G$ is not compact, the WZW model is non-rational. Moreover, its spectrum may include non highest weight representations. For example, the spectrum of the $SL(2,\mathbb{R})$ WZW model is built from highest weight representations, plus their images under the spectral flow automorphisms of the affine Lie algebra.

If $G$ is a supergroup, the spectrum may involve representations that do not factorize as tensor products of representations of the left- and right-moving symmetry algebras. This occurs for example in the case $G= GL(1|1)$, and also in more complicated supergroups such as $G=PSU(1,1|2)$. Non-factorizable representations are responsible for the fact that the corresponding WZW models are logarithmic conformal field theories.

=== Other theories based on affine Lie algebras ===
The known conformal field theories based on affine Lie algebras are not limited to WZW models. For example, in the case of the affine Lie algebra of the $SU(2)$ WZW model, modular invariant torus partition functions obey an ADE classification, where the $SU(2)$ WZW model accounts for the A series only. The D series corresponds to the $SO(3)$ WZW model, and the E series does not correspond to any WZW model.

Another example is the $H_3^+$ model. This model is based on the same symmetry algebra as the $SL(2,\mathbb{R})$ WZW model, to which it is related by Wick rotation. However, the $H_3^+$ is not strictly speaking a WZW model, as $H_3^+ =SL(2,\mathbb{C})/SU(2)$ is not a group, but a coset.

== Fields and correlation functions ==
=== Fields ===
Given a simple representation $\rho$ of the Lie algebra of $G$, an affine primary field $\Phi^\rho(z)$ is a field that takes values in the representation space of $\rho$, such that

$$J^a(y) \Phi^\rho(z) = -\frac{\rho(t^a)\Phi^\rho(z)}{y-z} + O(1)\ .$$

An affine primary field is also a primary field for the Virasoro algebra that results from the Sugawara construction. The conformal dimension of the affine primary field is given in terms of the quadratic Casimir $C_2(\rho)$ of the representation $\rho$ (i.e. the eigenvalue of the quadratic Casimir element $K_{ab}t^at^b$ where $K_{ab}$ is the inverse of the matrix $\mathcal{K}(t^a,t^b)$ of the Killing form) by

$$\Delta_\rho = \frac{C_2(\rho)}{2(k+h^\vee)}\ .$$

For example, in the $SU(2)$ WZW model, the conformal dimension of a primary field of spin $j$ is

$$\Delta_j = \frac{j(j+1)}{k+2} \ .$$

By the state-field correspondence, affine primary fields correspond to affine primary states, which are the highest weight states of highest weight representations of the affine Lie algebra.

=== Correlation functions ===
If the group $G$ is compact, the spectrum of the WZW model is made of highest weight representations, and all correlation functions can be deduced from correlation functions of affine primary fields via Ward identities.

If the Riemann surface $\Sigma$ is the Riemann sphere, correlation functions of affine primary fields obey Knizhnik–Zamolodchikov equations. On Riemann surfaces of higher genus, correlation functions obey Knizhnik–Zamolodchikov–Bernard equations, which involve derivatives not only of the fields' positions, but also of the surface's moduli.

== Gauged WZW models ==
Given a Lie subgroup $H\subset G$, the $G/H$ gauged WZW model (or coset model) is a nonlinear sigma model whose target space is the quotient $G/H$ for the adjoint action of $H$ on $G$. This gauged WZW model is a conformal field theory, whose symmetry algebra is a quotient of the two affine Lie algebras of the $G$ and $H$ WZW models, and whose central charge is the difference of their central charges.

== Applications ==
The WZW model whose Lie group is the universal cover of the group $\mathrm{SL}(2,\R)$ has been used by Juan Maldacena and Hirosi Ooguri to describe bosonic string theory on the three-dimensional anti-de Sitter space $AdS_3$. Superstrings on $AdS_3\times S^3$ are described by the WZW model on the supergroup $PSU(1,1|2)$, or a deformation thereof if Ramond-Ramond flux is turned on.

WZW models and their deformations have been proposed for describing the plateau transition in the integer quantum Hall effect.

The $SL(2,\mathbb{R})/U(1)$ gauged WZW model has an interpretation in string theory as Witten's two-dimensional Euclidean black hole. The same model also describes certain two-dimensional statistical systems at criticality, such as the critical antiferromagnetic Potts model.
