= Jan Łopuszański =

Jan Łopuszański may refer to:

- Jan Łopuszański (physicist) (1923-2008), professor of Wrocław University
- Jan Łopuszański (politician), (1955-) leader of the political party Polish Agreement
