= Projective superspace =

Supersymmetric-theory-dealing way in supersymmetry and quantum physics

In supersymmetry, a theory of particle physics, projective superspace is one way of dealing with $\mathcal{N}=2$ supersymmetric theories, i.e. with 8 real SUSY generators, in a manifestly covariant manner.

== See also ==
- Superspace
- Harmonic superspace
