= Harmonic superspace =

In supersymmetry, harmonic superspace is one way of dealing with supersymmetric theories with 8 real SUSY generators in a manifestly covariant manner. It turns out that the 8 real SUSY generators are pseudoreal, and after complexification, correspond to the tensor product of a four-dimensional Dirac spinor with the fundamental representation of SU(2)_{R}. The quotient space $SU(2)_R/U(1)_R \approx S^2 \simeq \mathbb{CP}^1$, which is a 2-sphere/Riemann sphere.

Harmonic superspace describes N=2 D=4, N=1 D=5, and N=(1,0) D=6 SUSY in a manifestly covariant manner.

There are many possible coordinate systems over S^{2}, but the one chosen not only involves redundant coordinates, but also happen to be a coordinatization of $SU(2)_R \approx S^3$. We only get S^{2} after a projection over $U(1)_R \approx S^1$. This is of course the Hopf fibration. Consider the left action of SU(2)_{R} upon itself. We can then extend this to the space of complex valued smooth functions over SU(2)_{R}. In particular, we have the subspace of functions which transform as the fundamental representation under SU(2)_{R}. The fundamental representation (up to isomorphism, of course) is a two-dimensional complex vector space. Let us denote the indices of this representation by i,j,k,...=1,2. The subspace of interest consists of two copies of the fundamental representation. Under the right action by U(1)_{R} -- which commutes with any left action—one copy has a "charge" of +1, and the other of -1. Let us label the basis functions $u^{\pm i}$.

$$\left(u^{+i}\right)^* = u^-_i$$.

The redundancy in the coordinates is given by

$$u^{+i}u^-_i = 1$$.

Everything can be interpreted in terms of algebraic geometry. The projection is given by the "gauge transformation" $u^{\pm i} \to e^{\pm i \phi} u^{\pm i}$ where φ is any real number. Think of S^{3} as a U(1)_{R}-principal bundle over S^{2} with a nonzero first Chern class. Then, "fields" over S^{2} are characterized by an integral U(1)_{R} charge given by the right action of U(1)_{R}. For instance, u^{+} has a charge of +1, and u^{−} of -1. By convention, fields with a charge of +r are denoted by a superscript with r +'s, and ditto for fields with a charge of -r. R-charges are additive under the multiplication of fields.

The SUSY charges are $Q^{i\alpha}$, and the corresponding fermionic coordinates are $\theta^{i\alpha}$. Harmonic superspace is given by the product of ordinary extended superspace (with 8 real fermionic coordinatates) with S^{2} with the nontrivial U(1)_{R} bundle over it. The product is somewhat twisted in that the fermionic coordinates are also charged under U(1)_{R}. This charge is given by

$$\theta^{\pm \alpha}= u^{\pm}_i \theta^{i\alpha}$$.

We can define the covariant derivatives $D^{\pm}_{\alpha}$ with the property that they supercommute with the SUSY transformations, and $D^{\pm}_{\alpha}f(u)=0$ where f is any function of the harmonic variables. Similarly, define

$$D^{++} \equiv u^{+i}\frac{\partial}{\partial u^{-i}}$$

and

$$D^{--} \equiv u^{-i}\frac{\partial}{\partial u^{+i}}$$.

A chiral superfield q with an R-charge of r satisfies $D^+_{\alpha}q=0$. A scalar hypermultiplet is given by a chiral superfield $q^+$. We have the additional constraint

$$D^{++}q^+ = J^{+++}(q^+,\, u)$$.

According to the Atiyah-Singer index theorem, the solution space to the previous constraint is a two-dimensional complex manifold.

== Relation to quaternions ==
The group $SU(2)_R$ can be identified with the Lie group of quaternions with unit norm under multiplication. $SU(2)_R$, and hence the quaternions act upon the tangent space of extended superspace. The bosonic spacetime dimensions transform trivially under $SU(2)_R$ while the fermionic dimensions transform according to the fundamental representation. The left multiplication by quaternions is linear. Now consider the subspace of unit quaternions with no real component, which is isomorphic to S^{2}. Each element of this subspace can act as the imaginary number i in a complex subalgebra of the quaternions. So, for each element of S^{2}, we can use the corresponding imaginary unit to define a complex-real structure over the extended superspace with 8 real SUSY generators. The totality of all CR structures for each point in S^{2} is harmonic superspace.

== See also ==
- Superspace
- Projective superspace
