= Thirring–Wess model =

Solvable 1+1 dimensional quantum field theory

The Thirring–Wess model or vector meson model is an exactly solvable quantum field theory, describing the interaction of a Dirac field with a vector field in dimension two. It is named after Walter Thirring and Julius Wess who introduced it in 1964.

== Definition ==
The Lagrangian density is made of three terms:

the free vector field $A^\mu$ is described by

$${(F^{\mu\nu})^2 \over 4}
+{\mu^2\over 2} (A^\mu)^2$$

for $F^{\mu\nu}= \partial^\mu A^\nu - \partial^\nu A^\mu$ and the boson mass $\mu$ must be strictly positive; the free fermion field $\psi$ is described by

$$\overline{\psi}(i\partial\!\!\!/-m)\psi$$

where the fermion mass $m$ can be positive or zero. And the interaction term is

$$qA^\mu(\bar\psi\gamma^\mu\psi)$$

Although not required to define the massive vector field, there can be also a gauge-fixing term

$${\alpha\over 2} (\partial^\mu A^\mu)^2$$

for $\alpha \ge 0$

There is a remarkable difference between the case $\alpha > 0$ and the case $\alpha = 0$: the latter requires a field renormalization to absorb divergences of the two point correlation.

== History ==
This model was introduced by Thirring and Wess as a version of the Schwinger model with a vector mass term in the Lagrangian .

When the fermion is massless ($m = 0$), the model is exactly solvable. One solution was found, for $\alpha = 1$, by Thirring and Wess using a method introduced by Kenneth Alan Johnson for the Thirring model; and, for $\alpha = 0$, two different solutions were given by Lowell S. Brown and Charles M. Sommerfield. Subsequently C. R. Hagen showed (for $\alpha = 0$, but it turns out to be true for $\alpha \ge 0$) that there is a one parameter family of solutions.
