= Superspace =

Base space for supersymmetric theories

Superspace is the coordinate space of a theory exhibiting supersymmetry. In such a formulation, along with ordinary space dimensions $x,\, y,\, z,\ldots$, there are also "anticommuting" dimensions whose coordinates are labeled in Grassmann numbers rather than real numbers. The ordinary space dimensions correspond to bosonic degrees of freedom, the anticommuting dimensions to fermionic degrees of freedom.

The word "superspace" was first used by John Wheeler in an unrelated sense to describe the configuration space of general relativity; for example, this usage may be seen in his 1973 textbook Gravitation.

== Informal discussion ==
There are several similar, but not equivalent, definitions of superspace that have been used, and continue to be used in the mathematical and physics literature. One such usage is as a synonym for super Minkowski space. In this case, one takes ordinary Minkowski space, and extends it with anti-commuting fermionic degrees of freedom, taken to be anti-commuting Weyl spinors from the Clifford algebra associated to the Lorentz group. Equivalently, the super Minkowski space can be understood as the quotient of the super Poincaré algebra modulo the algebra of the Lorentz group. A typical notation for the coordinates on such a space is $(x,\theta,\bar{\theta})$ with the overline being the give-away that super Minkowski space is the intended space.

Superspace is also commonly used as a synonym for the super vector space. This is taken to be an ordinary vector space, together with additional coordinates taken from the Grassmann algebra, i.e. coordinate directions that are Grassmann numbers. There are several conventions for constructing a super vector space in use; two of these are described by Rogers and DeWitt.

A third usage of the term "superspace" is as a synonym for a supermanifold: a supersymmetric generalization of a manifold. Note that both super Minkowski spaces and super vector spaces can be taken as special cases of supermanifolds.

A fourth, and completely unrelated meaning saw a brief usage in general relativity; this is discussed in greater detail at the bottom.

== Examples ==
Several examples are given below. The first few assume a definition of superspace as a super vector space. This is denoted as $\mathbb{R}^{m|n}$, the $\mathbb{Z}_2$-graded vector space with $\mathbb{R}^m$ as the even subspace and $\mathbb{R}^n$ as the odd subspace. The same definition applies to $\mathbb{C}^{m|n}$.

The four-dimensional examples take superspace to be super Minkowski space. Although similar to a vector space, this has many important differences: First of all, it is an affine space, having no special point denoting the origin. Next, the fermionic coordinates are taken to be anti-commuting Weyl spinors from the Clifford algebra, rather than being Grassmann numbers. The difference here is that the Clifford algebra has a considerably richer and more subtle structure than the Grassmann numbers. So, the Grassmann numbers are elements of the exterior algebra, and the Clifford algebra has an isomorphism to the exterior algebra, but its relation to the orthogonal group and the spin group, used to construct the spin representations, give it a deep geometric significance. (For example, the spin groups form a normal part of the study of Riemannian geometry, quite outside the ordinary bounds and concerns of physics.)

=== Trivial examples ===
The smallest superspace is a point which contains neither bosonic nor fermionic directions. Other trivial examples include the n-dimensional real plane $\mathbb{R}^n$, which is a vector space extending in $n$ real, bosonic directions and no fermionic directions. The vector space $\mathbb{R}^{0|n}$, which is the $n$-dimensional real Grassmann algebra. The space $\mathbb{R}^{1|1}$ of one even and one odd direction is known as the space of dual numbers, introduced by William Clifford in 1873.

=== The superspace of supersymmetric quantum mechanics ===
Supersymmetric quantum mechanics with $N$ supercharges is often formulated in the superspace $\mathbb{R}^{1|2N}$, which contains one real direction $t$ identified with time and $N$ complex Grassmann directions which are spanned by $\Theta_i$ and $\Theta_i^*$, where $i$ runs from 1 to $N$.

Consider the special case $N=1$. The superspace $\mathbb{R}^{1|2}$ is a 3-dimensional vector space. A given coordinate therefore may be written as a triple $(t,\Theta,\Theta^*)$. The coordinates form a Lie superalgebra, in which the gradation degree of $t$ is even and that of $\Theta$ and $\Theta^*$ is odd. This means that a bracket may be defined between any two elements of this vector space, and that this bracket reduces to the commutator on two even coordinates and on one even and one odd coordinate while it is an anticommutator on two odd coordinates. This superspace is an abelian Lie superalgebra, which means that all of the aforementioned brackets vanish

$$\left[ t,t\right]=\left[ t, \theta\right]=\left[ t, \theta^*\right]=\left\{\theta, \theta\right\}=\left\{ \theta, \theta^*\right\} =\left\{ \theta^*, \theta^*\right\}=0$$

where $[a,b]$ is the commutator of $a$ and $b$ and $\{a,b\}$ is the anticommutator of $a$ and $b$.

One may define functions from this vector space to itself, which are called superfields. The above algebraic relations imply that, if we expand our superfield as a power series in $\Theta$ and $\Theta^*$, then we will only find terms at the zeroeth and first orders, because $\Theta^2=(\Theta^*)^2=0$. Therefore, superfields may be written as arbitrary functions of $t$ multiplied by the zeroeth and first order terms in the two Grassmann coordinates

$$\Phi \left(t,\Theta,\Theta^* \right)=\phi(t)+\Theta\Psi(t)-\Theta^*\Phi^*(t)+\Theta\Theta^* F(t)$$

Superfields, which are representations of the supersymmetry of superspace, generalize the notion of tensors, which are representations of the rotation group of a bosonic space.

One may then define derivatives in the Grassmann directions, which take the first order term in the expansion of a superfield to the zeroeth order term and annihilate the zeroeth order term. One can choose sign conventions such that the derivatives satisfy the anticommutation relations

$$\left\{\frac{\partial}{\partial \theta}\,,\Theta\right\}=\left\{\frac{\partial}{\partial \theta^*}\,,\Theta^*\right\}=1$$

These derivatives may be assembled into supercharges

$$Q=\frac{\partial}{\partial \theta}-i\Theta^*\frac{\partial}{\partial t}\quad \text{and} \quad Q^\dagger=\frac{\partial}{\partial \theta^*}+i\Theta\frac{\partial}{\partial t}$$

whose anticommutators identify them as the fermionic generators of a supersymmetry algebra

$$\left\{ Q,Q^\dagger\,\right\}=2i\frac{\partial}{\partial t}$$

where $i$ times the time derivative is the Hamiltonian operator in quantum mechanics. Both $Q$ and its adjoint anticommute with themselves. The supersymmetry variation with supersymmetry parameter $\epsilon$ of a superfield $\Phi$ is defined to be

$$\delta_\epsilon\Phi=(\epsilon^* Q+\epsilon Q^\dagger)\Phi.$$

We can evaluate this variation using the action of $Q$ on the superfields

$$\left[Q,\Phi \right]=\left(\frac{\partial}{\partial \theta}\,-i\theta^*\frac{\partial}{\partial t}\right)\Phi=\psi+\theta^*\left(F-i\dot{\phi}\right)+i\theta\theta^*\dot{\psi}.$$

Similarly one may define covariant derivatives on superspace

$$D=\frac{\partial}{\partial \theta}-i\theta^*\frac{\partial}{\partial t}\quad \text{and} \quad D^\dagger=\frac{\partial}{\partial \theta^*}-i\theta\frac{\partial}{\partial t}$$

which anticommute with the supercharges and satisfy a wrong sign supersymmetry algebra

$$\left\{D,D^\dagger\right\}=-2i\frac{\partial}{\partial t}$$.

The fact that the covariant derivatives anticommute with the supercharges means the supersymmetry transformation of a covariant derivative of a superfield is equal to the covariant derivative of the same supersymmetry transformation of the same superfield. Thus, generalizing the covariant derivative in bosonic geometry which constructs tensors from tensors, the superspace covariant derivative constructs superfields from superfields.

=== Supersymmetric extensions of Minkowski space ===
==== $\mathbf{N=1}$ super Minkowski space ====
Perhaps the most studied concrete superspace in physics is $d = 4, \mathcal{N} = 1$ super Minkowski space $\mathbb{R}^{4|4}$ or sometimes written $\mathbb{R}^{1,3|4}$, which is the direct sum of four real bosonic dimensions and four real Grassmann dimensions (also known as fermionic dimensions or spin dimensions).

In supersymmetric quantum field theories one is interested in superspaces which furnish representations of a Lie superalgebra called a supersymmetry algebra. The bosonic part of the supersymmetry algebra is the Poincaré algebra, while the fermionic part is constructed using spinors with Grassmann number valued components.

For this reason, in physical applications one considers an action of the supersymmetry algebra on the four fermionic directions of $\mathbb{R}^{4|4}$ such that they transform as a spinor under the Poincaré subalgebra. In four dimensions there are three distinct irreducible 4-component spinors. There is the Majorana spinor, the left-handed Weyl spinor and the right-handed Weyl spinor. The CPT theorem implies that in a unitary, Poincaré invariant theory, which is a theory in which the S-matrix is a unitary matrix and the same Poincaré generators act on the asymptotic in-states as on the asymptotic out-states, the supersymmetry algebra must contain an equal number of left-handed and right-handed Weyl spinors. However, since each Weyl spinor has four components, this means that if one includes any Weyl spinors one must have 8 fermionic directions. Such a theory is said to have extended supersymmetry, and such models have received a lot of attention. For example, supersymmetric gauge theories with eight supercharges and fundamental matter have been solved by Nathan Seiberg and Edward Witten, see Seiberg–Witten gauge theory. However, in this subsection we are considering the superspace with four fermionic components and so no Weyl spinors are consistent with the CPT theorem.

Note: There are many sign conventions in use and this is only one of them.

Therefore, the four fermionic directions transform as a Majorana spinor $\theta_\alpha$. We can also form a conjugate spinor

$$\bar{\theta}\ \stackrel{\mathrm{def}}{=}\   i\theta^\dagger\gamma^0=-\theta^\perp C$$

where $C$ is the charge conjugation matrix, which is defined by the property that when it conjugates a gamma matrix, the gamma matrix is negated and transposed. The first equality is the definition of $\bar\theta$ while the second is a consequence of the Majorana spinor condition $\theta^* = i\gamma_0 C\theta$. The conjugate spinor plays a role similar to that of $\theta^*$ in the superspace $\mathbb{R}^{1|2}$, except that the Majorana condition, as manifested in the above equation, imposes that $\theta$ and $\theta^*$ are not independent.

In particular we may construct the supercharges

$$Q=-\frac{\partial}{\partial\bar{\theta}}+\gamma^\mu\theta\partial_\mu$$

which satisfy the supersymmetry algebra

$$\left\{Q,Q\right\}=\left\{\overline{Q},Q\right\}C=2\gamma^\mu\partial_\mu C=-2i\gamma^\mu P_\mu C$$

where $P=i\partial_\mu$ is the 4-momentum operator. Again the covariant derivative is defined like the supercharge but with the second term negated and it anticommutes with the supercharges. Thus the covariant derivative of a supermultiplet is another supermultiplet.

==== Extended supersymmetry ====
It is possible to have $\mathcal{N}$ sets of supercharges $Q^I$ with $I = 1, \cdots, \mathcal{N}$, although this is not possible for all values of $\mathcal{N}$.

These supercharges generate translations in a total of $4\mathcal{N}$ spin dimensions, hence forming the superspace $\mathbb{R}^{4|4\mathcal N}$.

== In general relativity ==
The word "superspace" is also used in a completely different and unrelated sense, in the book Gravitation by Misner, Thorne and Wheeler. There, it refers to the configuration space of general relativity, and, in particular, the view of gravitation as geometrodynamics, an interpretation of general relativity as a form of dynamical geometry. In modern terms, this particular idea of "superspace" is captured in one of several different formalisms used in solving the Einstein equations in a variety of settings, both theoretical and practical, such as in numerical simulations. This includes primarily the ADM formalism, as well as ideas surrounding the Hamilton–Jacobi–Einstein equation and the Wheeler–DeWitt equation.

== See also ==
- Chiral superspace
- Harmonic superspace
- Projective superspace
- Super Minkowski space
- Supergroup
- Lie superalgebra
