= C-number =

Old nomenclature which refers to real and complex numbers

The term c-number (classical number) is an old nomenclature introduced by Paul Dirac which refers to real and complex numbers. It is used to distinguish from operators (q-numbers or quantum numbers) in quantum mechanics.

Although c-numbers are commuting, the term anti-commuting c-number is also used to refer to a type of anti-commuting numbers that are mathematically described by Grassmann numbers. The term is also used to refer solely to "commuting numbers" in at least one major textbook.

In the early days of quantum mechanics when the idea that observables are represented by noncommuting operators was still new and strange, some people spoke of quantum observables as "quantities whose values are q-numbers" — the notion of "q-number" being meant to suggest noncommutativity — as opposed to "quantities whose values are c-numbers," i.e., ordinary complex-valued quantities whose algebra is commutative. One still finds the terms q-number (rarely) and c-number (more frequently) in the physics literature; in particular, to say that an operator is a c-number is to say that it is a scalar multiple of the identity. (E.g., "The commutator of A and B is just a c-number.")

— G. B. Folland, Quantum Field Theory: A Tourist Guide for Mathematicians (2008)
