= Jan Łopuszański (physicist) =

Polish physicist (1923–2008)

- Born: October 21, 1923; Lviv, Second Polish Republic
- Died: April 30, 2008 (aged 84); Wrocław, Poland
- Education: University of Wrocław; Jagiellonian University
- Occupation: theoretical physicist
- Known for: Haag–Lopuszanski–Sohnius theorem
- Awards: Knight's Cross of the Order of Polonia Restituta (1965)
- Scientific career
- Workplaces: University of Wrocław; Polish Academy of Sciences

Jan Łopuszański (Polish: [jan wɔˈpuʂaɲski]; 21 October 1923 – 30 April 2008) was a Polish theoretical physicist and author of several textbooks about classical, statistical and quantum physics. In the field of quantum field theory, he is most famous as co-author of the Haag–Lopuszanski–Sohnius theorem concerning the possibility of supersymmetry in renormalizable QFT's.

== Career ==
Jan Łopuszański was born on 21 October 1923 in Lwów, Poland. During 1945-50 he studied physics at the University of Wrocław. In 1950, he received his M.A. in Wrocław, in 1955 his Ph.D. at the Jagiellonian University in Cracow. Since 1947, he was part of regular staff member at the University of Wrocław. In 1968, he became a full professor.

During the years 1957–59, he was the vice dean and during the years 1962–65, was dean of the Faculty of Mathematics, Physics and Chemistry. From 1970 to 1984, he was director of the Institute of Theoretical Physics (Instytut Fizyki Teoretycznej Uniwersytet Wroclawski). From 1960 onward, he held the chair for mathematical methods in physics until he retired in 1994.

In 1976, he was elected a corresponding member and in 1986 permanent member of the Polish Academy of Sciences. In 1996, he became a corresponding member of the Poland Academy of Arts and Sciences in Cracow. He had visiting professorships in Utrecht, NYU, IAS in Princeton, New Jersey, SUNY at Stony Brook, University of Göttingen, Bielefeld, Max Planck Institute in Munich, CERN in Geneva and ICTP in Trieste. He was also member of the editor board of Reports on Mathematical Physics and Fortschritte der Physik. He wrote about 80 original professional papers, 40 review articles and 5 major textbooks.

== Personal life ==
J. Łopuszański had a son named Maciej with Halina Pidek, and after divorcing her, was married to Barbara Zasłonka. His hobbies are reported to be baroque music and gardening.

On 30 April 2008 Jan Łopuszański died of a heart attack in his home in Wrocław.

== Sources ==
- R. Haag, J. T. Lopuszanski and M. Sohnius, "All Possible Generators of Supersymmetries of the S Matrix", Nucl. Phys. B 88 (1975) 257.

Textbooks by J. Łopuszański:

  - Łopuszański, J., Pawlikowski A.: Fizyka Statystyczna, PWN Warszawa (1969).
  - Łopuszański, J.: An Introduction to the Conventional Quantum Field Theory, Wroclaw University (1976).
  - Łopuszański, J.: Rachunek Spinorow, PWN Warszawa (1985).
  - Łopuszański, J.: Introduction to Symmetry and Supersymmetry in Quantum Field Theory, World Scientific (1991)
  - Łopuszański, J.: The Inverse Variational Problem in Classical Mechanics, Eds. Word Scientific (1999)
