= Supergroup (physics) =

Algebraic structure used in theoretical physics

The concept of supergroup is a generalization of that of group. In other words, every supergroup carries a natural group structure, but there may be more than one way to structure a given group as a supergroup. A supergroup is like a Lie group in that there is a well defined notion of smooth function defined on them. However the functions may have even and odd parts. Moreover, a supergroup has a super Lie algebra which plays a role similar to that of a Lie algebra for Lie groups in that they determine most of the representation theory and which is the starting point for classification.

== Details ==
More formally, a Lie supergroup is a supermanifold G together with a multiplication morphism $\mu :G \times G\rightarrow G$, an inversion morphism $i : G \rightarrow G$ and a unit morphism $e: 1 \rightarrow G$ which makes G a group object in the category of supermanifolds. This means that, formulated as commutative diagrams, the usual associativity and inversion axioms of a group continue to hold. Since every manifold is a supermanifold, a Lie supergroup generalises the notion of a Lie group.

There are many possible supergroups. The ones of most interest in theoretical physics are the ones which extend the Poincaré group or the conformal group. Of particular interest are the orthosymplectic groups Osp(M|N) and the superunitary groups SU(M|N).

An equivalent algebraic approach starts from the observation that a supermanifold is determined by its ring of supercommutative smooth functions, and that a morphism of supermanifolds corresponds one to one with an algebra homomorphism between their functions in the opposite direction, i.e. that the category of supermanifolds is opposite to the category of algebras of smooth graded commutative functions. Reversing all the arrows in the commutative diagrams that define a Lie supergroup then shows that functions over the supergroup have the structure of a Z_{2}-graded Hopf algebra. Likewise the representations of this Hopf algebra turn out to be Z_{2}-graded comodules. This Hopf algebra gives the global properties of the supergroup.

There is another related Hopf algebra which is the dual of the previous Hopf algebra. It can be identified with the Hopf algebra of graded differential operators at the origin. It only gives the local properties of the symmetries i.e., it only gives information about infinitesimal supersymmetry transformations. The representations of this Hopf algebra are modules. Like in the non-graded case, this Hopf algebra can be described purely algebraically as the universal enveloping algebra of the Lie superalgebra.

In a similar way one can define an affine algebraic supergroup as a group object in the category of superalgebraic affine varieties. An affine algebraic supergroup has a similar one to one relation to its Hopf algebra of superpolynomials. Using the language of schemes, which combines the geometric and algebraic point of view, algebraic supergroup schemes can be defined including super Abelian varieties.

== Examples ==
The super-Poincaré group is the group of isometries of superspace (specifically, Minkowski superspace with $\mathcal{N}$ supercharges, where often $\mathcal{N}$ is taken to be 1). It is most often treated at the algebra level, and is generated by the super-Poincaré algebra.

The super-conformal group is the group of conformal symmetries of superspace, generated by the super-conformal algebra.
