= Bruno Zumino =

Italian physicist (1923–2014)

- Born: 28 April 1923; Rome, Italy
- Died: 21 June 2014 (aged 91); Berkeley, California
- Education: University of Rome
- Known for: Wess-Zumino model Wess–Zumino–Witten model Wess–Zumino consistency condition Coleman–Wess–Zumino construction for nonlinear symmetries Pure 4D N = 1 supergravity
- Awards: Dirac Medal (1987); Heineman Prize (1988); Max Planck Medal (1989); Wigner Medal (1992); Humboldt Prize (1992); Enrico Fermi Prize (2005)
- Scientific career
- Fields: Theoretical physics
- Workplaces: Berkeley; CERN; New York University

Bruno Zumino (28 April 1923 − 21 June 2014) was an Italian theoretical physicist and faculty member at the University of California, Berkeley. He obtained his DSc degree from the University of Rome in 1945.

He was renowned for his rigorous proof of the CPT theorem with Gerhart Lüders; his pioneering systematization of effective chiral Lagrangians; the discoveries, with Julius Wess, of the Wess–Zumino model, the first four-dimensional supersymmetric quantum field theory with Bose–Fermi degeneracy, and initiator of the field of supersymmetric radiative restrictions; a concise formulation of supergravity; and for his deciphering of structured flavour-chiral anomalies, codified in the Wess–Zumino–Witten model of conformal field theory.

== Awards ==
- 1985 Membership in the National Academy of Sciences
- 1987 Dirac Medal of the ICTP
- 1988 Dannie Heineman Prize for Mathematical Physics
- 1989 Max Planck Medal
- 1992 Wigner Medal
- 1992 Humboldt Research Award
- 1999 Gian Carlo Wick Commemorative Gold Medal
- 2005 Enrico Fermi Prize of the Italian Physical Society

== See also ==
- Polyakov action
