= Julius Wess =

Austrian theoretical physicist (1934–2007)

Julius E. Wess
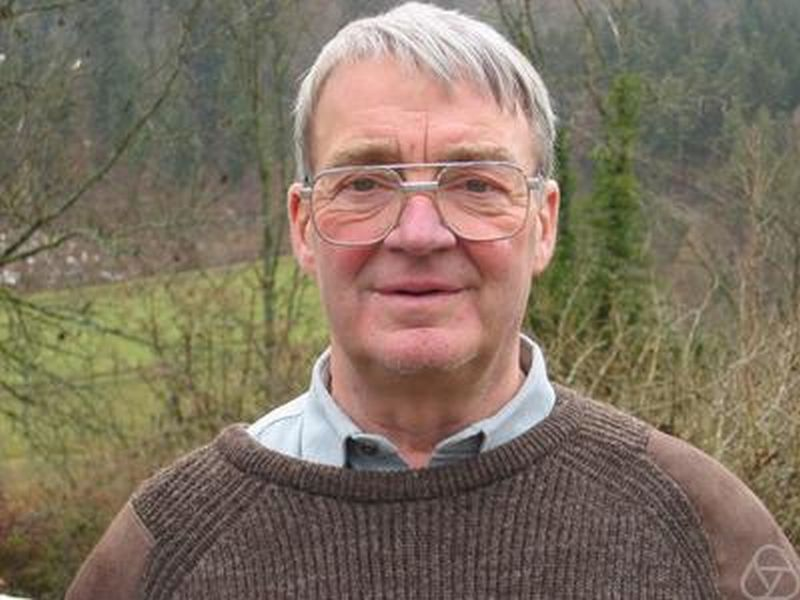
- Born: 5 December 1934; Oberwölz Stadt, Styria
- Died: 8 August 2007 (aged 72); Hamburg, Germany
- Education: University of Vienna
- Known for: Wess-Zumino model Wess–Zumino–Witten model Wess–Zumino consistency condition Thirring–Wess model Coleman–Wess–Zumino construction for nonlinear symmetries
- Awards: Leibniz Prize (1986); Max Planck Medal (1987); Heineman Prize (1988); Wigner medal (1992)
- Scientific career
- Fields: Theoretical physics
- Doctoral advisor: Hans Thirring
- Doctoral students: Hermann Nicolai

Julius Erich Wess (5 December 1934 – 8 August 2007) was an Austrian theoretical physicist noted as the co-inventor of the Wess–Zumino model and Wess–Zumino–Witten model in the field of supersymmetry and conformal field theory. He was also a recipient of the Max Planck medal, the Wigner medal, the Gottfried Wilhelm Leibniz Prize, the Heineman Prize, and of several honorary doctorates.

== Life and work ==
Wess was born in Oberwölz Stadt, a small town in the Austrian state of Styria. In 1957 he received his Ph.D. in Vienna, where he was a student of Hans Thirring. His Ph.D. examiner was acclaimed quantum mechanics physicist Erwin Schrödinger. After working at CERN in Switzerland and at the Courant Institute of New York University, United States, he became a professor at the University of Karlsruhe (TH). In later life, Wess was professor at LMU Munich. After his retirement he worked at DESY in Hamburg.

His doctoral students include Hermann Nicolai.

Julius Wess died at the age of 72 in Hamburg, following a stroke.

His early work centered on effective field theories for hadrons, especially the interactions connecting pions and kaons with protons and neutrons. His 1969 papers with Sidney Coleman, Curtis Callan, and Zumino detailed the mathematical structure of theories with spontaneously broken symmetries. The papers laid much of the foundation for phenomenological hadron physics, but they have had even wider application. They are still being cited today.
Wess’s most highly cited work is the 1971 paper with Zumino on anomalies in effective field theories. Anomalies occur when quantum effects violate classical symmetries, giving rise to physical phenomena such as the decay of a neutral pion into two photons. Wess and Zumino showed that anomalous terms in effective Lagrangians must obey certain consistency relations. Those conditions are so important that the terms are now named after them.
Despite the fame of that early work, Wess will always be known for the 1974 papers in which he and Zumino constructed the first renormalizable supersymmetric quantum field theory in four dimensions and exhibited its nonrenormalization properties at one loop. Their work ignited an explosion of interest in supersymmetry, a concept that has come to dominate much of modern theoretical physics. His textbook on supersymmetry, with one of us (Bagger), is still a standard reference after 25 years.

== Publications ==
- Wess, Julius; Bagger, Jonathan (1983). Supersymmetry and supergravity. Princeton, N.J: Princeton University Press. ISBN 0-691-08326-6. OCLC 9081798.
- Wess, Julius; Bagger, Jonathan (1983). Supersymmetry and supergravity, Revised and Expanded Edition. Princeton, N.J: Princeton University Press. ISBN 0-691-02530-4. OCLC 1151346932.
- Scientific articles authored by Julius Wess recorded in INSPIRE-HEP.
