= Supercharge =

Generator of supersymmetry transformations

In theoretical physics, a supercharge is a generator of supersymmetry transformations. It is an example of the general notion of a charge in physics.

Supercharge, denoted by the symbol Q, is an operator which transforms bosons into fermions, and vice versa. Since the supercharge operator changes a particle with spin one-half to a particle with spin one or zero, the supercharge itself is a spinor that carries one half unit of spin.

Depending on the context, supercharges may also be called Grassmann variables or Grassmann directions; they are generators of the exterior algebra of anti-commuting numbers, the Grassmann numbers. All these various usages are essentially synonymous; they refer to the $\mathbb{Z}_2$ grading between bosons and fermions, or equivalently, the grading between c-numbers and a-numbers. Calling it a charge emphasizes the notion of a symmetry at work.

== Commutation ==
Supercharge is described by the super-Poincaré algebra.

Supercharge commutes with the Hamiltonian operator:

[ Q , H ] = 0

So does its adjoint.

== See also ==
- R-symmetry
