= Super-Poincaré algebra =

Supersymmetric generalization of the Poincaré algebra

In theoretical physics, a super-Poincaré algebra is an extension of the Poincaré algebra to incorporate supersymmetry, a relation between bosons and fermions. They are examples of supersymmetry algebras (without central charges or internal symmetries), and are Lie superalgebras. Thus a super-Poincaré algebra is a Z_{2}-graded vector space with a graded Lie bracket such that the even part is a Lie algebra containing the Poincaré algebra, and the odd part is built from spinors on which there is an anticommutation relation with values in the even part.

== Informal sketch ==
The Poincaré algebra describes the isometries of Minkowski spacetime. From the representation theory of the Lorentz group, it is known that the Lorentz group admits two inequivalent complex spinor representations, dubbed $2$ and $\overline{2}$. (Note: The barred representations are conjugate linear while the unbarred ones are complex linear. The numeral refers to the dimension of the representation space. Another more common notation is to write (1/2, 0) and (0, 1/2) respectively for these representations. The general irreducible representation is then (m, n), where m, n are half-integral and correspond physically to the spin content of the representation, which ranges from |m + n| to |m − n| in integer steps, each spin occurring exactly once.) Taking their tensor product, one obtains $2\otimes \overline{2}=3\oplus 1$; such decompositions of tensor products of representations into direct sums is given by the Littlewood–Richardson rule.

Normally, one treats such a decomposition as relating to specific particles: so, for example, the pion, which is a chiral vector particle, is composed of a quark-anti-quark pair. However, one could also identify $3\oplus 1$ with Minkowski spacetime itself. This leads to a natural question: if Minkowski space-time belongs to the adjoint representation, then can Poincaré symmetry be extended to the fundamental representation? Well, it can: this is exactly the super-Poincaré algebra. There is a corresponding experimental question: if we live in the adjoint representation, then where is the fundamental representation hiding? This is the program of supersymmetry, which has not been found experimentally.

== History ==
The super-Poincaré algebra was first proposed in the context of the Haag–Łopuszański–Sohnius theorem, as a means of avoiding the conclusions of the Coleman–Mandula theorem. That is, the Coleman–Mandula theorem is a no-go theorem that states that the Poincaré algebra cannot be extended with additional symmetries that might describe the internal symmetries of the observed physical particle spectrum. However, the Coleman–Mandula theorem assumed that the algebra extension would be by means of a commutator; this assumption, and thus the theorem, can be avoided by considering the anti-commutator, that is, by employing anti-commuting Grassmann numbers. The proposal was to consider a supersymmetry algebra, defined as the semidirect product of a central extension of the super-Poincaré algebra by a compact Lie algebra of internal symmetries.

== Definition ==
The simplest supersymmetric extension of the Poincaré algebra contains two Weyl spinors with the following anti-commutation relation:

$$\{Q_{\alpha}, \bar Q_{\dot{\beta}}\} = 2{\sigma^\mu}_{\alpha\dot{\beta}}P_\mu$$

and all other anti-commutation relations between the Qs and Ps vanish. The operators $Q_\alpha, \bar Q_\dot\alpha$ are known as supercharges. In the above expression $P_\mu$ are the generators of translation and $\sigma^\mu$ are the Pauli matrices. The index $\alpha$ runs over the values $\alpha=1,2.$ A dot is used over the index $\dot{\beta}$ to remind that this index transforms according to the inequivalent conjugate spinor representation; one must never accidentally contract these two types of indexes. The Pauli matrices can be considered to be a direct manifestation of the Littlewood–Richardson rule mentioned before: they indicate how the tensor product $2\otimes\overline{2}$ of the two spinors can be re-expressed as a vector. The index $\mu$ of course ranges over the space-time dimensions $\mu=0,1,2,3.$

It is convenient to work with Dirac spinors instead of Weyl spinors; a Dirac spinor can be thought of as an element of $2\oplus\overline{2}$; it has four components. The Dirac matrices are thus also four-dimensional, and can be expressed as direct sums of the Pauli matrices. The tensor product then gives an algebraic relation to the Minkowski metric $g^{\mu \nu}$ which is expressed as:

$$\{ \gamma^\mu,\gamma^\nu \} = 2g^{\mu \nu}$$

and

$$\sigma^{\mu \nu}=\frac{i}{2}\left[ \gamma^\mu,\gamma^\nu \right]$$

This then gives the full algebra

$$\begin{align}
\left[ M^{\mu \nu} , Q_\alpha \right] &= \frac{1}{2} ( \sigma^{\mu \nu})_\alpha^{\;\;\beta} Q_\beta \\
\left[ Q_\alpha , P^\mu \right] &= 0 \\
\{ Q_\alpha , \bar{Q}_{\dot{\beta}} \} &= 2 ( \sigma^\mu )_{\alpha \dot{\beta}} P_\mu \\
\end{align}$$

which are to be combined with the normal Poincaré algebra. It is a closed algebra, since all Jacobi identities are satisfied and can have since explicit matrix representations. Following this line of reasoning will lead to supergravity.

=== Extended supersymmetry ===
It is possible to add more supercharges. That is, we fix a number which by convention is labelled $\mathcal{N}$, and define supercharges $Q^I_\alpha, \bar Q^I_\dot\alpha$ with $I = 1, \cdots, \mathcal{N}.$

These can be thought of as many copies of the original supercharges, and hence satisfy

$$[M^{\mu\nu}, Q^I_\alpha] = (\sigma^{\mu\nu})_\alpha{}^\beta Q^I_\beta$$
$$[P^\mu, Q^I_\alpha] = 0$$

and

$$\{Q^I_\alpha, \bar Q^J_\dot\alpha\} = 2\sigma^\mu_{\alpha\dot\alpha}P_\mu\delta^{IJ}$$

but can also satisfy

$$\{Q^I_\alpha, Q^J_\beta\} = \epsilon_{\alpha\beta}Z^{IJ}$$

and

$$\{\bar Q^I_\dot\alpha, \bar Q^J_\dot\beta\} = \epsilon_{\dot\alpha\dot\beta}Z^{\dagger IJ}$$

where $Z^{IJ} = -Z^{JI}$ is the central charge.

== Super-Poincaré group and superspace ==
Just as the Poincaré algebra generates the Poincaré group of isometries of Minkowski space, the super-Poincaré algebra, an example of a Lie super-algebra, generates what is known as a supergroup. This can be used to define superspace with $\mathcal{N}$ supercharges: these are the right cosets of the Lorentz group within the $\mathcal{N}$ super-Poincaré group.

Just as $P_\mu$ has the interpretation as being the generator of spacetime translations, the charges $Q^I_\alpha, \bar Q^I_\dot\alpha$, with $I = 1, \cdots, \mathcal{N}$, have the interpretation as generators of superspace translations in the 'spin coordinates' of superspace. That is, we can view superspace as the direct sum of Minkowski space with 'spin dimensions' labelled by coordinates $\theta^I_\alpha, \bar\theta^{I\dot\alpha}$. The supercharge $Q^I_\alpha$ generates translations in the direction labelled by the coordinate $\theta^I_\alpha.$ By counting, there are $4\mathcal{N}$ spin dimensions.

=== Notation for superspace ===
The superspace consisting of Minkowski space with $\mathcal{N}$ supercharges is therefore labelled $\mathbb{R}^{1,3|4\mathcal{N}}$ or sometimes simply $\mathbb{R}^{4|4\mathcal{N}}$.

== SUSY in 3 + 1 Minkowski spacetime ==
In (3 + 1) Minkowski spacetime, the Haag–Łopuszański–Sohnius theorem states that the SUSY algebra with N spinor generators is as follows.

The even part of the star Lie superalgebra is the direct sum of the Poincaré algebra and a reductive Lie algebra B (such that its self-adjoint part is the tangent space of a real compact Lie group). The odd part of the algebra would be

$$\left(\frac{1}{2},0\right)\otimes V\oplus\left(0,\frac{1}{2}\right)\otimes V^*$$

where $(1/2,0)$ and $(0,1/2)$ are specific representations of the Poincaré algebra. (Compared to the notation used earlier in the article, these correspond $\overline{2}\oplus 1$ and $1\oplus 2$, respectively, also see the footnote where the previous notation was introduced). Both components are conjugate to each other under the * conjugation. V is an N-dimensional complex representation of B and V^{*} is its dual representation. The Lie bracket for the odd part is given by a symmetric equivariant pairing {.,.} on the odd part with values in the even part. In particular, its reduced intertwiner from $\left[\left(\frac{1}{2},0\right)\otimes V\right]\otimes\left[\left(0,\frac{1}{2}\right)\otimes V^*\right]$ to the ideal of the Poincaré algebra generated by translations is given as the product of a nonzero intertwiner from $\left(\frac{1}{2},0\right)\otimes\left(0,\frac{1}{2}\right)$ to (1/2,1/2) by the "contraction intertwiner" from $V\otimes V^*$ to the trivial representation. On the other hand, its reduced intertwiner from $\left[\left(\frac{1}{2},0\right)\otimes V\right]\otimes \left[\left(\frac{1}{2},0\right)\otimes V\right]$ is the product of a (antisymmetric) intertwiner from $\left(\frac{1}{2},0\right)\otimes\left(\frac{1}{2},0\right)$ to (0,0) and an antisymmetric intertwiner A from $N^2$ to B. Conjugate it to get the corresponding case for the other half.

=== N = 1 ===
B is now $\mathfrak{u}(1)$ (called R-symmetry) and V is the 1D representation of $\mathfrak{u}(1)$ with charge 1. A (the intertwiner defined above) would have to be zero since it is antisymmetric.

Actually, there are two versions of N=1 SUSY, one without the $\mathfrak{u}(1)$ (i.e. B is zero-dimensional) and the other with $\mathfrak{u}(1)$.

=== N = 2 ===
B is now $\mathfrak{su}(2)\oplus \mathfrak{u}(1)$ and V is the 2D doublet representation of $\mathfrak{su}(2)$ with a zero $\mathfrak{u}(1)$ charge. Now, A is a nonzero intertwiner to the $\mathfrak{u}(1)$ part of B.

Alternatively, V could be a 2D doublet with a nonzero $\mathfrak{u}(1)$ charge. In this case, A would have to be zero.

Yet another possibility would be to let B be $\mathfrak{u}(1)_A\oplus \mathfrak{u}(1)_B \oplus \mathfrak{u}(1)_C$. V is invariant under $\mathfrak{u}(1)_B$ and $\mathfrak{u}(1)_C$ and decomposes into a 1D rep with $\mathfrak{u}(1)_A$ charge 1 and another 1D rep with charge -1. The intertwiner A would be complex with the real part mapping to $\mathfrak{u}(1)_B$ and the imaginary part mapping to $\mathfrak{u}(1)_C$.

Or we could have B being $\mathfrak{su}(2)\oplus \mathfrak{u}(1)_A\oplus \mathfrak{u}(1)_B$ with V being the doublet rep of $\mathfrak{su}(2)$ with zero $\mathfrak{u}(1)$ charges and A being a complex intertwiner with the real part mapping to $\mathfrak{u}(1)_A$ and the imaginary part to $\mathfrak{u}(1)_B$.

This doesn't even exhaust all the possibilities. We see that there is more than one N = 2 supersymmetry; likewise, the SUSYs for N > 2 are also not unique (in fact, it only gets worse).

=== N = 3 ===
It is theoretically allowed, but the multiplet structure becomes automatically the same with that of an N=4 supersymmetric theory. So it is less often discussed compared to N=1,2,4 version.

=== N = 4 ===
This is the maximal number of supersymmetries in a theory without gravity.

=== N = 8 ===
This is the maximal number of supersymmetries in any supersymmetric theory. Beyond $\mathcal{N} = 8$, any massless supermultiplet contains a sector with helicity $\lambda$ such that $|\lambda| > 2$. Such theories on Minkowski space must be free (non-interacting).

== SUSY in various dimensions ==
In 0 + 1, 2 + 1, 3 + 1, 4 + 1, 6 + 1, 7 + 1, 8 + 1, and 10 + 1 dimensions, a SUSY algebra is classified by a positive integer N.

In 1 + 1, 5 + 1 and 9 + 1 dimensions, a SUSY algebra is classified by two nonnegative integers (M, N), at least one of which is nonzero. M represents the number of left-handed SUSYs and N represents the number of right-handed SUSYs.

The reason of this has to do with the reality conditions of the spinors.

Hereafter d = 9 means d = 8 + 1 in Minkowski signature, etc. The structure of supersymmetry algebra is mainly determined by the number of the fermionic generators, that is the number N times the real dimension of the spinor in d dimensions. It is because one can obtain a supersymmetry algebra of lower dimension easily from that of higher dimensionality by the use of dimensional reduction.

=== Upper bound on dimension of supersymmetric theories ===
The maximum allowed dimension of theories with supersymmetry is $d = 11 = 10 + 1$, which admits a unique theory called eleven-dimensional supergravity which is the low-energy limit of M-theory. This incorporates supergravity: without supergravity, the maximum allowed dimension is $d = 10 = 9 + 1$.

=== d = 11 ===
The only example is the N = 1 supersymmetry with 32 supercharges.

=== d = 10 ===
From d = 11, N = 1 SUSY, one obtains N = (1, 1) nonchiral SUSY algebra, which is also called the type IIA supersymmetry. There is also N = (2, 0) SUSY algebra, which is called the type IIB supersymmetry. Both of them have 32 supercharges.

N = (1, 0) SUSY algebra with 16 supercharges is the minimal susy algebra in 10 dimensions. It is also called the type I supersymmetry. Type IIA / IIB / I superstring theory has the SUSY algebra of the corresponding name. The supersymmetry algebra for the heterotic superstrings is that of type I.
