= 4D N = 1 supergravity =

Theory of supergravity in four dimensions

In supersymmetry, 4D $\mathcal N = 1$ supergravity is the theory of supergravity in four dimensions with a single supercharge. It contains exactly one supergravity multiplet, consisting of a graviton and a gravitino, but can also have an arbitrary number of chiral and vector supermultiplets, with supersymmetry imposing stringent constraints on how these can interact. The theory is primarily determined by three functions, those being the Kähler potential, the superpotential, and the gauge kinetic matrix. Many of its properties are strongly linked to the geometry associated to the scalar fields in the chiral multiplets. After the simplest form of this supergravity was first discovered, a theory involving only the supergravity multiplet, the following years saw an effort to incorporate different matter multiplets, with the general action being derived in 1982 by Eugène Cremmer, Sergio Ferrara, Luciano Girardello, and Antonie Van Proeyen.

This theory plays an important role in many Beyond the Standard Model scenarios. Notably, many four-dimensional models derived from string theory are of this type, with supersymmetry providing crucial control over the compactification procedure. The absence of low-energy supersymmetry in our universe requires that supersymmetry is broken at some scale. Supergravity provides new mechanisms for supersymmetry breaking that are absent in global supersymmetry, such as gravity mediation. Another useful feature is the presence of no-scale models, which have numerous applications in cosmology.

== History ==
Supergravity was first discovered in 1976 in the form of pure 4D $\mathcal N=1$ supergravity. This was a theory of only the graviton and its superpartner, the gravitino. The first extension to also couple matter fields to the theory was acquired by adding Maxwell and Yang–Mills fields, as well as a Fayet–Iliopoulos term. Chiral multiplets were also incorporated, starting first by coupling a single massless chiral multiplet. The primary construction technique in these early years was using the iterative Noether method, which does not lend itself towards deriving more general matter coupled actions due to being very tedious.

The development of tensor calculus techniques in 1978 allowed for the construction of supergravity actions more efficiently, with them quickly used to derive the general action coupling a single chiral multiplet to supergravity. Using the same technique, the general four-dimensional matter-coupled $\mathcal N=1$ supergravity action was constructed in 1982 by Eugène Cremmer, Sergio Ferrara, Luciano Girardello, and Antonie Van Proeyen. It was also derived by Jonathan Bagger shortly after using superspace techniques, with this work highlighting important geometric features of the theory. Around this time two other features of the models were identified. These are the Kähler–Hodge structure present in theory and the presence and importance of no-scale models.

== Overview ==
The particle content of a general four-dimensional $\mathcal N=1$ supergravity consists of a single supergravity multiplet and an arbitrary number of chiral multiplets and gauge multiplets. The supergravity multiplet $(g_{\mu\nu},\psi_\mu)$ contains the spin-2 graviton describing fluctuations in the spacetime metric $g_{\mu\nu}$, along with a spin-3/2 Majorana gravitino $\psi_{\alpha \mu}$, where the spinor index $\alpha$ is often left implicit. The chiral multiplets $(\phi^n, \chi^n)$, indexed by lower-case Latin indices $n$, each consist of a scalar $\phi^n$ and its Majorana superpartner $\chi^n$. (Note: There are differences in normalization conventions across different authors. Notably, Supergravity by Freedman and Van Proeyen differs from Supergravity by Dell'Agata and Zagermann in the normalization of the scalar $\phi_{FVP}^\alpha = \tfrac{1}{\sqrt 2}\phi_{DZ}^\alpha$ as well as the gravitino $\psi^{FVP}_\mu = M_P^{-1}\psi^{DZ}_\mu$.) Similarly, the gauge multiplets $(A_\mu^I, \lambda^I)$ consist of a Yang–Mills gauge field $A_\mu^I$ and its Majorana superpartner the gaugino $\lambda^I$, with these multiplets indexed by capital Latin letters $I$.

One of the most important structures of the theory is the scalar manifold, which is the field space manifold whose coordinates are the scalars. Global supersymmetry implies that this manifold must be a special type of complex manifold known as a Kähler manifold. Local supersymmetry of supergravity further restricts its form to be that of a Kähler–Hodge manifold.

The theory is primarily described by three arbitrary functions of the scalar fields, the first being the Kähler potential $K(\phi,\bar \phi)$ which fixes the metric on the scalar manifold. The second is the superpotential, which is an arbitrary holomorphic function $W(\phi)$ that fixes a number of aspects of the action such as the scalar field F-term potential along with the fermion mass terms and Yukawa couplings. Lastly, there is the gauge kinetic matrix whose components are holomorphic functions $f_{IJ}(\phi)$ determining, among other aspects, the gauge kinetic term, the theta term, and the D-term potential.

Additionally, the supergravity may be gauged or ungauged. In ungauged supergravity, any gauge transformations present can only act on abelian gauge fields. Meanwhile, a gauged supergravity can be acquired from an ungauged one by gauging some of its global symmetries, which can cause the scalars or fermions to also transform under gauge transformations and result in non-abelian gauge fields. Besides local supersymmetry transformations, local Lorentz transformations, and gauge transformations, the action must also be invariant under Kähler transformations $K(\phi, \bar \phi)\rightarrow K(\phi,\bar \phi) + f(\phi)+\bar f(\bar \phi)$, where $f(\phi)$ is an arbitrary holomorphic function of the scalar fields.

== Construction ==
Historically, the first approach to constructing supergravity theories was the iterative Noether formalism which uses a globally supersymmetric theory as a starting point. Its Lagrangian is then coupled to pure supergravity through the term $\mathcal L \supset -\psi^\mu j_\mu$ which couples the gravitino to the supercurrent of the original theory, with everything also Lorentz covariantized to make it valid in curved spacetime. This candidate theory is then varied with respect to local supersymmetry transformations yielding some nonvanishing part. The Lagrangian is then modified by adding to it new terms that cancel this variation, at the expense of introducing new nonvanishing variations. More terms are the introduced to cancel these, and the procedure is repeated until the Lagrangian is fully invariant.

Since the Noether formalism proved to be very tedious and inefficient, more efficient construction techniques were developed. Various sets of auxiliary fields were found which allow one to construct off-shell supersymmetric multiplets, meaning that they satisfy the supersymmetry algebra without needing to also impose equations of motion. The discovery of these led to the development of the tensor calculus formalism, where one can take products and sums of the multiplets to construct supersymmetrically invariant densities from which a supergravity action can be acquired. This method, using the old minimal set of auxiliary fields, was the one first used to construct the general matter-coupled 4D $\mathcal N=1$ supergravity theory.

The superspace approach was being developed at the same time, with this generalizing the notion of superspace to a curved superspace whose tangent space at each point behaves like the traditional flat superspace from global supersymmetry. The general invariant action can then be constructed in terms of the superfields, which can then be expanded in terms of the component fields to give the component form of the supergravity action.

Another approach which unifies various tensor calculus methods is the superconformal tensor calculus approach which uses conformal symmetry as a tool to construct supergravity actions that do not themselves have any conformal symmetry. This is done by first constructing a gauge theory using the superconformal algebra. This theory contains extra fields and symmetries, but they can be eliminated using constraints or through gauge fixing to yield Poincaré supergravity without conformal symmetry.

The superconformal and superspace ideas have also been combined into a number of different supergravity conformal superspace formulations. The direct generalization of the original on-shell superspace approach is the Grimm–Wess–Zumino formalism. There is also the $\text{U}(1)$ superspace formalism proposed by Paul Howe. Lastly, the $\mathcal N=1$ conformal superspace approach has the convenient property that any other formulation of conformal supergravity is either equivalent to it or can otherwise be obtained from a partial gauge fixing. Other approaches also exist, such as the group manifold method which treats fields as the components of one-forms on a supergroup manifold.

== Symmetries ==
=== Scalar manifold and Kähler transformations ===
Supergravity often uses Majorana spinor notation over that of Weyl spinors since four-component notation is easier to use in curved spacetime. Weyl spinors can be acquired as projections of a Majorana spinor $\chi$, with the left and right handed Weyl spinors denoted by $\chi_{L,R} = P_{L,R} \chi$.

Complex scalars in the chiral multiplets act as coordinates on a complex manifold in the sense of the non-linear sigma model, known as the scalar manifold. In supersymmetric theories these manifolds are imprinted with additional geometric constraints arising from the supersymmetry transformations. In $\mathcal N=1$ supergravity this manifold may be compact or noncompact, while for $\mathcal N>1$ supergravities it is necessarily noncompact.

Global supersymmetry already restricts the manifold to be a Kähler manifolds. These are a type of complex manifold, which roughly speaking are manifolds that look locally like $\mathbb C^n$ and whose transition maps are holomorphic functions. Complex manifolds are also Hermitian manifolds if they admit a well-defined metric whose only nonvanishing components are the $g_{m\bar n}$ components, where the bar over the index denotes the conjugate coordinate $\phi^{\bar n} \equiv \bar\phi^n$. More generally, a bar over scalars denotes complex conjugation while for spinors it denotes an adjoint spinor. Kähler manifolds are Hermitian manifolds that admit a two-form called a Kähler form

$$\Omega = i g_{m\bar n} d\phi^m \wedge d\phi^{\bar n},$$

that is closed $d\Omega= 0$. A property of these manifolds is that their metric can be written in terms of the derivatives of a scalar function $g_{m\bar n}= \partial_m \partial_{\bar n} K$, where the $K(\phi, \bar \phi)$ is known as the Kähler potential. Here $\partial_n$ denotes a derivative with respect to $\phi^n$. This potential corresponding to a particular metric is not unique and can be changed by the addition of the real part of a holomorphic function $h(\phi)$ in what are known as Kähler transformations

$$K(\phi, \bar \phi) \rightarrow K(\phi, \bar \phi) + h(\phi) + \bar h(\bar \phi).$$

Since this does not change the scalar manifold, supersymmetric actions must be invariant under such transformations. (Note: Kähler transformations are not physical symmetries in the conventional sense since they do not act on the fundamental fields and so have no associated Noether current. Rather, they signify a redundancy in the description of the theory.)

While in global supersymmetry, fields and the superpotential transform trivially under Kähler transformations, in supergravity they are charged under the Kähler transformations as

$$W \rightarrow e^{-\frac{h}{M_P^2}}W,$$
$$\chi^m \rightarrow e^{i \frac{\text{Im}(h)}{2M_P^2}\gamma_5}\chi^m,$$
$$\psi_\mu, \epsilon, \lambda^I \rightarrow e^{-i\frac{\text{Im}(h)}{2M_P^2}\gamma_5}\psi_\mu, \epsilon, \lambda^I,$$

where $\epsilon$ is the Majorana spinor supersymmetry transformation parameter. These transformation rules impose further restrictions on the geometry of the scalar manifold. Since the superpotential transforms by a prefactor, this implies that the scalar manifold must globally admit a consistent line bundle. The fermions meanwhile transform by a complex phase, which implies that the scalar manifold must also admit an associated $\text{U}(1)$ principal bundle. The nondynamical (Note: The connection is not dynamical in the sense that there is no associated gauge field with its own equation of motion. Instead the connection is simply a function of fields.) connection corresponding to this principal bundle is given by

$$Q_\mu = \frac{i}{2}\bigg[(\partial_{\bar n}K)\partial_\mu \phi^{\bar n} - (\partial_m K)\partial_\mu \phi^m - A^I_\mu (r_I-\bar r_I)\bigg],$$

with this satisfying $dQ = \Omega$, where $\Omega$ is the Kähler form. Here $r_I$ are holomorphic functions associated to the gauge sector, described below. This condition means that the scalar manifold in four-dimensional $\mathcal N=1$ supergravity must be of a type which can admit a connection whose field strength is equal to the Kähler form. Such manifolds are known as Kähler–Hodge manifolds. In terms of characteristic classes, this condition translates to the requirement that $c_1(L) = [\mathcal K]$ where $c_1(L)$ is the first Chern class of the line bundle, while $[\mathcal K]$ is the cohomology class of the Kähler form.

An implication of the presence of an associated $\text{U}(1)$ principal bundle on the Kähler–Hodge manifold is that its field strength $\Omega=dQ$ must be quantized on any topologically non-trivial two-sphere of the scalar manifold, analogous to the Dirac quantization condition for magnetic monopoles. This arises due to the cocycle condition, which is the consistency of the connection across different coordinate patches. This can have various implications for the resulting physics, such as on an $S^2$ scalar manifold, it results in the quantization of Newton's constant.

=== Global symmetries of ungauged supergravity ===
Global symmetries in ungauged supergravity fall roughly into three classes; they are subgroups of the scalar manifold isometry group, they are rotations among the gauge fields, or they are the R-symmetry group. A given symmetry can also be a simultaneous combination of more than one of these. The exact global symmetry group depends on the details of the theory, such as the particular superpotential and gauge kinetic function, which provide additional constraints on the symmetry group.

The global symmetry group of a supergravity with $n_v$ abelian vector multiplets and $n_c$ chiral multiplets must be a subgroup of $G_{\text{iso}}\times G_v \times U(1)_R$. (Note: This is the maximal possible global symmetry group, with specific features of the theory usually breaking it down to a smaller subgroup) Here $G_{\text{iso}}$ is the isometry group of the scalar manifold, $G_v$ is the set of symmetries acting only on the vector fields, and $\text{U}(1)_R$ is the R-symmetry group, with this surviving as a global symmetry only in theories with a vanishing superpotential. When the gauge kinetic matrix (mathematics) is a function of $n_{cv}\leq n_c$ scalars, then the isometry group decomposes into $G_{\text{iso}} \rightarrow G_{\text{iso},c}\times G_{\text{iso},cv}$, where the first group acts only on the scalars leaving the vectors unchanged, while the second simultaneously transforms both the scalars and vectors. These simultaneous transformations are not conventional symmetries of the action, rather they are duality transformations that leave the equations of motion and Bianchi identity unchanged, similar to the Montonen–Olive duality. (Note: Since the transformation of the scalars will necessarily change the gauge kinetic matrix, the transformation of the vectors will be such as to compensate for this change.)

Global symmetries acting on scalars can only be subgroups of the isometry group of the scalar manifold since the transformations must preserves the scalar metric. Infinitesimal isometry transformations are described by Killing vectors $\xi^n_I(\phi)$, which are vectors satisfying the Killing equation $\mathcal L_{\xi_I}g = 0$, where $\mathcal L_{\xi_I}$ is the Lie derivative along the direction of the Killing vector. They act on the scalars as $\phi^n \rightarrow \phi^n+\alpha^I\xi_I^n(\phi)$ (Note: The chiralino also transforms under scalar field redefinition transformations as a vector on the scalar manifold.) and are the generators for the isometry algebra, satisfying the structure equation

$$[\xi_I, \xi_J] = f_{IJ}{}^K \xi_K.$$

Since the scalar manifold is a complex manifold, Killing vectors corresponding to symmetries of this manifold must also preserve the complex structure $\mathcal L_{\xi_I} J = 0$, (Note: The tensor field $J$, defined by $J^2=-1$, determines the almost complex structure of a complex manifold.) which implies that they must be holomorphic $\xi^{\bar m}_I = \bar \xi^m_I$. Therefore, the gauge group must be a subgroup of the group formed by holomorphic Killing vectors, not merely a subgroup of the isometry group. For Kähler manifolds, this condition additionally implies that there exists a set of holomorphic functions known as Killing prepotentials $\mathcal P_I$ which satisfy $i_{\xi_I} J = d \mathcal P_I$, where $i_{\xi_I}$ is the interior product. The Killing prepotentials can be explicitly written in terms of the Kähler potential

$$\mathcal P_J = \frac{i}{2}[\xi^m_I \partial_m K - \xi_I^{\bar n}\partial_{\bar n}K - (r_I-\bar r_I)],$$

where the holomorphic functions $r_I(\phi)$ are the Kähler transformations that undo the isometry transformation, defined by

$$\xi_I^m \partial_m K + \xi_I^{\bar n}\partial_{\bar n}K = r_I(\phi)+\bar r_I(\bar \phi).$$

The prepotential must also satisfy a consistency condition known as the equivariance condition

$$\xi_I^mg_{m\bar n}\xi_J^{\bar n} - \xi_J^mg_{m\bar n}\xi_I^{\bar n} = if_{IJ}{}^K \mathcal P_K,$$

where $f_{IJ}{}^K$ are the structure constants of the gauge algebra.

An additional restriction on global symmetries of scalars is that the superpotential must be invariant up to the same Kähler transformation $r_I(\phi)$ that leaves the Kähler potential invariant, which imposes the condition that the only admissible superpotentials are ones satisfying

$$\xi_I^n \partial_n W = \frac{r_I}{M_P^2} W.$$

Global symmetries involving scalars present in the gauge kinetic matrix still act on the scalar fields as isometry transformations, but now these transformations change the gauge kinetic matrix. To leave the theory invariant under a scalar isometry transformation requires a compensating transformation on the vectors. (Note: Consider the gauge kinetic term under some isometry transformation $\phi \rightarrow \phi'$, under which $\text{Re}(f(\phi))F^2\rightarrow \text{Re}(f(\phi'))F^2$. Generally, $f(\phi)\neq f(\phi')$, so this action will not be invariant if the transformation acts on scalars alone. Instead, one needs to also act on the gauge field to make $F^2$ compensate for the change in the gauge kinetic matrix.) These vector transformations can be expressed as transformations on the electric field strength tensors $F^{\mu\nu}_I$ and their dual magnetic counterpart $G^{\mu\nu}_I$ defined from the equation of motion

$$\star G_I^{\mu\nu} = 2\frac{\delta S}{\delta F^I_{\mu\nu}}.$$

Writing the field strengths and dual field strengths in a single vector allows the most general transformations to be written as $\delta_I (\begin{smallmatrix}F\\G\end{smallmatrix}) = T_I(\begin{smallmatrix}F \\ G \end{smallmatrix})$ where the generators of these transformation are given by

$$T_I = \begin{pmatrix} a_{I}{}^J{}_K & b_I{}^{JK} \\ c_{IJK} & d_{IJ}{}^K \end{pmatrix}.$$

Demanding that the equations of motion and Bianchi identities are unchanged restricts the transformations to be a subgroup of the symplectic group $\text{Sp}(2n_v,\mathbb R)$. The exact generators depend on the particular gauge kinetic matrix, with them

$$\xi_I^n \partial_n f_{JK}(\phi) = c_{IJK}+d_{IJ}{}^Mf_{MK}-f_{JM}a_{I}{}^M{}_K + b_I{}^{MN}f_{JM}f_{KN}$$

fixing the coefficients determining $T_I$. Transformations involving $b_I \neq 0$, are non-perturbative symmetries that do not leave the action invariant since they map the electric field strength into the magnetic field strength. Rather, these are duality transformations that are only symmetries at the level of the equations of motion, related to the electromagnetic duality. Meanwhile, transformations with $c_I\neq 0$ are known as generalized Peccei–Quinn shifts and they only leave the action invariant up to total derivatives. Global symmetries involving only vectors $G_v$ are transformations that map the field strength tensor into itself and generally belong to $\text{O}(n_v) \subset \text{Sp}(2n_v,\mathbb R)$.

=== Gauge symmetry ===
In an ungauged supergravity, gauge symmetry only consists of abelian transformations of the gauge fields $\delta A^I_\mu = \partial_\mu \alpha^I(x)$, with no other fields being gauged.

Meanwhile, gauged supergravity gauges some of the global symmetries of the ungauged theory. Since the global symmetries are strongly limited by the details of the theory present, such as the scalar manifold, the scalar potential, and the gauge kinetic matrix, the available gauge groups are likewise limited.

Gauged supergravity is invariant under the gauge transformations with gauge parameter $\alpha^I(x)$ given by

$$\delta_\alpha \phi^n = \alpha^I(x) \xi_I^n,$$
$$\delta_\alpha \chi^n = \alpha^I(x)\partial_m\xi^n_I \chi^m + \frac{1}{4M_P^2}\alpha^I(x)(r_I-\bar r_I)\chi^n,$$
$$\delta_\alpha A^I_\mu = \partial_\mu \alpha^I(x) + \alpha^J(x) f_{KJ}{}^IA^K_\mu,$$
$$\delta_\alpha \lambda^I = \alpha^J(x)f_{KJ}{}^I\lambda^K -\frac{1}{4M_P^2}\alpha^J(x)\gamma_5(r_J-\bar r_J)\lambda^I,$$
$$\delta_\alpha \psi_{L\mu} = -\frac{1}{4M_P^2}\alpha^I(x)(r_I-\bar r_I) \psi_{L\mu}.$$

Here $\xi^n_I$ are the generators of the gauged algebra (Note: This can be smaller than the algebra of the original global symmetry if only a subalgebra of it is being gauged. There could be a remaining ungauged subalgebra under whom the action is not gauge invariant but is still globally invariant.) while $r_I(\phi)$ are defined as the compensating Kähler transformations needed to restore the Kähler potential to its original form after performing scalar field isometry transformations, with their imaginary components fixed by the equivariance condition. Whenever a $\text{U}(1)$ subgroup is gauged, as occurs when R-symmetry is gauged, this does not fix $\text{Im}(r_I)$, with these terms then referred to as Fayet–Iliopoulos terms.

=== Covariant derivatives ===
Supergravity has a number of distinct symmetries, all of which require their own covariant derivatives. The standard Lorentz covariant derivative on curved spacetime is denoted by $D_\mu$, with this being trivial for scalar fields, while for fermionic fields it can be written using the spin connection $\omega_\mu^{ab}$ as

$$D_\mu = \partial_\mu + \tfrac{1}{4}\omega_\mu{}^{ab}\gamma_{ab}.$$

Scalars transform nontrivially only under scalar coordinate transformations and gauge transformations, so their covariant derivative is given by

$$\hat \partial_\mu \phi^n = \partial_\mu \phi^n - A^I_\mu \xi_I^n,$$

where $\xi^n_I(\phi)$ are the holomorphic Killing vectors corresponding to the gauged isometry subgroup of the scalar manifold. A hat above a derivative indicates that it is covariant with respect to gauge transformations. Meanwhile, the superpotential only transforms nontrivially under Kähler transformations and so has a covariant derivative given by

$$\mathcal D_nW = \partial_nW +\frac{1}{M_P^2}(\partial_n K)W,$$

where $\partial_n$ is a derivative with respect to $\phi^n$.

The various covariant derivatives associated to the fermions depend upon which symmetries the fermions are charged under. The gravitino transforms under both Lorentz and Kähler transformation, while the gaugino additionally also transforms under gauge transformations. The chiralino transforms under all these as well as transforming as a vector under scalar field redefinitions. Therefore, their covariant derivatives are given by

$$\mathcal D_\mu \psi_\nu = D_\mu \psi_\nu + \frac{i}{2M_P^2}Q_\mu \gamma_5 \psi_\nu,$$
$$\hat{\mathcal D}_\mu\lambda^I = D_\mu \lambda^I + A^J_\mu f^I_{JK}\lambda^K + \frac{i}{2M_P^2}Q_\mu \gamma_5 \lambda^I,$$
$$\hat{\mathcal D}_\mu \chi^m_L = D_\mu\chi^m_L + (\hat \partial_\mu \phi^n)\Gamma^m_{nl} \chi^l_L - A^I_\mu (\partial_n \xi^m_I)\chi^n_L - \frac{i}{2M_P^2}Q_\mu \chi^m_L.$$

Here $\Gamma^m_{nl} = g^{m\bar p}\partial_n g_{l \bar p}$ is the Christoffel symbol of the scalar manifold, while $f_{JK}{}^I$ are the structure constants of the Lie algebra associated to the gauge group. Lastly, $Q_\mu$ is the $\text{U}(1)$ connection on the scalar manifold, with its explicit form given in terms of the Kähler potential described previously.

=== R-symmetry ===
R-symmetry of $\mathcal N=1$ superalgebras is a global symmetry acting only on fermions, transforming them by a phase

$$\chi^m \rightarrow e^{i\theta \gamma_5}\chi^m, \ \ \ \ \ \ \psi_\mu, \lambda^I \rightarrow e^{-i\theta \gamma_5}\psi_\mu, \lambda^I.$$

This is identical to the way that a constant Kähler transformation acts on fermions, differing from such transformations only in that it does not additionally transform the superpotential. Since Kähler transformations are necessarily symmetries of supergravity, R-symmetry is only a symmetry of supergravity when these two coincide, which only occurs for a vanishing superpotential.

Whenever R-symmetry is a global symmetry of the ungauged theory, it can be gauged to construct a gauged supergravity, which does not necessarily require gauging any chiral scalars. The simplest example of such a supergravity is Freedman's gauged supergravity which only has a single vector used to gauge R-symmetry and whose bosonic action is equivalent to an Einstein–Maxwell–de Sitter theory.

== 4D N = 1 supergravity Lagrangian ==
The Lagrangian for 4D $\mathcal N=1$ supergravity with an arbitrary number of chiral and vector supermultiplets can be split up as

$$\mathcal L = \mathcal L_{\text{kinetic}} + \mathcal L_{\text{theta}} + \mathcal L_{\text{mass}} + \mathcal L_{\text{interaction}} + \mathcal L_{\text{supercurrent}} + \mathcal L_{\text{potential}}+ \mathcal L_{\text{4-fermion}}.$$

Besides being invariant under local supersymmetry transformations, this Lagrangian also is Lorentz invariant, gauge invariant, and Kähler transformation invariant, with covariant derivatives being covariant under these. The three main functions determining the structure of the Lagrangian are the superpotential, the Kähler potential, and the gauge kinetic matrix.

=== Kinetic and theta terms ===
The first term in the Lagrangian consists of all the kinetic terms of the fields

$$e^{-1}\mathcal L_{\text{kinetic}} = \frac{M_P^2}{2}R - \frac{M_P^2}{2}\bar \psi_\mu \gamma^{\mu \nu \rho}\mathcal D_\nu \psi_\rho$$
$$- g_{m\bar n}[(\hat \partial_\mu \phi^m)(\hat \partial^\mu \phi^{\bar n})+\bar \chi_L^m \hat{{\mathcal D}\!\!\!/} \chi_R^n + \bar \chi_R^{\bar n}\hat{{\mathcal D}\!\!\!/}\chi_L^m]$$
$$+ \text{Re}(f_{IJ}) \bigg[-\frac{1}{4}F_{\mu\nu}^I F^{\mu\nu J}-\frac{1}{2}\bar \lambda^I \hat{{\mathcal D}\!\!\!/}\lambda^J\bigg].$$

The first line is the kinetic action for the supergravity multiplet, made up of the Einstein–Hilbert action and the covariantized Rarita–Schwinger action; this line is the covariant generalization of the pure supergravity action. The formalism used for describing gravity is the vielbein formalism, where $e^\mu_a$ is the vielbein while $\omega^\mu_{ab}$ is the spin connection. Additionally, $e = \det e^a_\mu = \sqrt{-g}$ and $M_P$ is the four-dimensional Planck mass.

The second line consists of the kinetic terms for the chiral multiplets, with its overall form determined by the scalar manifold metric which itself is fully fixed by the Kähler potential $g_{m\bar n}= \partial_m \partial_{\bar n} K$. The third line has the kinetic terms for the gauge multiplets, with their behaviour fixed by the real part of the gauge kinetic matrix. The holomorphic gauge kinetic matrix $f_{IJ}(\phi)$ must have a positive definite real part to have kinetic terms with the correct sign. The slash on the covariant derivatives corresponds to the Feynman slash notation $\partial\!\!\!/ = \gamma^\mu \partial_\mu$, while $F^I_{\mu\nu}$ are the field strengths of the gauge fields $A^I_\mu$.

The gauge sector also introduces a theta-like term

$$e^{-1}\mathcal L_{\text{theta}} = \frac{1}{8}\text{Im}(f_{IJ})\bigg[F_{\mu\nu}^I F_{\rho \sigma}^J \epsilon^{\mu\nu\rho \sigma}-2i \hat{\mathcal D}_\mu(e \bar \lambda^I \gamma_5 \gamma^\mu \lambda^J)\bigg],$$

with this being a total derivative whenever the imaginary part of the gauge kinetic matrix is a constant, in which case it does not contribute to the classical equations of motion.

=== Mass and interaction terms ===
The supergravity action has a set of mass-like bilinear terms for its fermions given by

$$e^{-1}\mathcal L_{\text{mass}} = \frac{1}{2M_P^2}e^{K/2M_P^2}W \bar \psi_{\mu R}\gamma^{\mu\nu}\psi_{\nu R}$$
$$+\frac{1}{4}e^{K/2M_P^2}(\mathcal D_mW)g^{m\bar n}\partial_{\bar n}\bar f_{IJ}\bar \lambda_R^I \lambda^J_R - \frac{1}{2}e^{K/2M_P^2}(\mathcal D_m\mathcal D_nW)\bar \chi^{\bar m}_L \chi^n_L$$
$$+ \frac{i\sqrt 2}{4}D^I \partial_m f_{IJ}\bar \chi_L^m \lambda^J - \sqrt 2 \xi^{\bar n}_I g_{m\bar n}\bar \lambda^I \chi^m_L + h.c..$$

The D-terms $D^I$ are defined as

$$D^I = (\text{Re} \ f)^{-1IJ}\mathcal P_J,$$

where $\mathcal P_J$ are the holomorphic Killing prepotentials and $W(\phi)$ is the holomorphic superpotential. The first line in the Lagrangian is the mass-like term for the gravitino while the remaining two lines are the mass terms for the chiralini and gluini along with bilinear mixing terms for these. These terms determine the masses of the fermions since evaluating the Lagrangian in a vacuum state with constant scalar fields reduces the Lagrangian to a set of fermion bilinears with numerical prefactors. This can be written as a matrix, with the eigenvalues of this mass matrix being the masses of the fermions in the mass basis. The mass eigenstates are in general linear combinations of the chiralini and gaugini fermions.

The next term in the Lagrangian is the supergravity generalization of a similar term found in the corresponding globally supersymmetric action that describes mixing between the gauge boson, a chiralino, and the gaugino. In the supergravity Lagrangian it is given by

$$e^{-1}\mathcal L_{\text{interaction}} = -\frac{1}{4 \sqrt 2}\partial_m f_{IJ}F_{\mu\nu}^I \bar \chi_L^m \gamma^{\mu\nu}\lambda^J_L + h.c..$$

=== Supercurrent terms ===
The supercurrent terms describe the coupling of the gravitino to generalizations of the chiral and gauge supercurrents from global supersymmetry as

$$e^{-1}\mathcal L_{\text{supercurrent}} = -(J^\mu_{\text{chiral}}\psi_{\mu L} + h.c.)-J^\mu_{\text{gauge}}\psi_\mu,$$

where

$$J^\mu_{\text{chiral}} = -\tfrac{1}{\sqrt 2}g_{m\bar n}\bar \chi_L^m \gamma^\mu \gamma^\nu \hat \partial_\nu \phi^{\bar n} + \tfrac{1}{\sqrt 2}\bar \chi^{\bar n}_R \gamma^\mu e^{K/2M_P^2}\mathcal D_{\bar n}\bar W,$$
$$J^\mu_{\text{gauge}} = -\tfrac{1}{4}\bar \lambda^J\text{Re}(f_{IJ}) F^I_{\nu \rho}\gamma^\mu\gamma^{\nu \rho} - \tfrac{i}{2} \bar \lambda^J \mathcal P_J \gamma^\mu \gamma_5.$$

These are the supercurrents of the chiral sector and of the gauge sector modified appropriately to be covariant under the symmetries of the supergravity action. They provide additional bilinear terms between the gravitino and the other fermions that need to be accounted for when going into the mass basis.

The presence of terms coupling the gravitino to the supercurrents of the global theory is a generic feature of supergravity theories since the gravitino acts as the gauge field for local supersymmetry. This is analogous to the case of gauge theories more generally, where gauge fields couple to the current associated to the symmetry that has been gauged. For example, quantum electrodynamics consists of the Maxwell action and the Dirac action, together with a coupling between the photon and the current $-ej^\mu A_\mu$, with this usually being absorbed into the definition of the fermion covariant derivative.

=== Scalar potential ===
The potential term in the Lagrangian describes the scalar potential $e^{-1}\mathcal L_{\text{potential}} = - V(\phi, \bar \phi)$ as

$$V(\phi, \bar \phi) = e^{K/M_P^2}\bigg[g^{m\bar n}(\mathcal D_m W)(\mathcal D_{\bar n}\bar W)-\frac{3|W|^2}{M_P^2}\bigg]+\frac{1}{2}\text{Re}(f_{IJ})D^ID^J,$$

where the first term is known as the F-term, and is a generalization of the potential arising from the chiral multiplets in global supersymmetry, together with a new negative gravitational contribution proportional to $|W|^2$. The second term is called the D-term and is also found in a similar form in global supersymmetry, with it arising from the gauge sector. In the absence of Fayet–Iliopoulos terms, the D-term vanishes when there are no chiral multiplets.

The Kähler potential and the superpotential are not independent in supergravity since Kähler transformations allow for the shifting of terms between them. The two functions can instead be packaged into an invariant function known as the Kähler invariant function

$$G = M_P^{-2}K+ \ln (M_P^{-6}|W|^2).$$

The F-term part of the potential can be written in terms of this function as

$$V_F(\phi, \bar \phi) = M_P^4e^{G}[\partial_m G (\partial^m \partial^{\bar n}G) \partial_{\bar n}G - 3].$$

=== Four-fermion terms ===
Finally, there are the four-fermion interaction terms. These are given by

$$e^{-1}\mathcal L_{\text{4-fermion}} = \frac{M_P^2}{2}\mathcal L_{\text{SG}}$$
$$+ \bigg[-\frac{1}{4 \sqrt 2}\partial_m f_{IJ}\bar \psi_\mu \gamma^\mu \chi^m \bar \lambda^I \lambda^J_L + \frac{1}{8}(\mathcal D_m \partial_n f_{IJ})\bar \chi^m \chi^n \bar \lambda^I \lambda^J_L + h.c.\bigg]$$
$$+ \frac{1}{16}ie^{-1} \epsilon^{\mu\nu\rho\sigma}\bar \psi_\mu \gamma_\nu \psi_\rho\bigg(\frac{1}{2}\text{Re}(f_{IJ})\bar \lambda^I \gamma_5 \gamma_\sigma \lambda^J + g_{m \bar n}\bar \chi^{\bar n} \gamma_\sigma \chi^m\bigg)- \frac{1}{2}g_{m \bar n}\bar \psi_\mu \chi^{\bar n}\bar \psi^\mu \chi^m$$
$$+ \frac{1}{4}\bigg(R_{m \bar n p \bar q} - \frac{1}{2M_P^2}g_{m \bar n}g_{p \bar q}\bigg) \bar \chi^m \chi^p \bar \chi^{\bar n} \chi^{\bar q}$$
$$+\frac{3}{64 M_P^2}[\text{Re}(f_{IJ})\bar \lambda^I \gamma_\mu \gamma_5 \lambda^J]^2 -\frac{1}{16} \partial_m f_{IJ}\bar \lambda^I \lambda^J_Lg^{m\bar n}\bar \partial_{\bar n} f_{KM} \bar \lambda^K \lambda_R^M$$
$$+ \frac{1}{16} (\text{Re}(f))^{-1 \ IJ}(\partial_m f_{IK} \bar \chi^m - \partial_{\bar m}\bar f_{IK}\bar \chi^{\bar m})\lambda^K (\partial_n f_{JM}\bar \chi^{n}- \partial_{\bar n}\bar f_{JM}\bar \chi^{\bar n})\lambda^M$$
$$- \frac{1}{4M_P^2}g_{m \bar n}\text{Re}(f_{IJ}) \bar \chi^{m}\lambda^I \bar \chi^{\bar n} \lambda^J.$$

Here $R_{m\bar np\bar q}$ is the scalar manifold Riemann tensor, while $\mathcal L_{\text{SG}}$ is the supergravity four-gravitino interaction term

$$e^{-1}\mathcal L_{\text{SG}} = -\frac{1}{16}[(\bar \psi^\rho \gamma^\mu \psi^\nu)(\bar \psi_\rho \gamma_\mu \psi_\nu + 2 \bar \psi_\rho \gamma_\nu \psi_\mu)-4(\bar \psi_\mu \gamma^\sigma \psi_\sigma)(\bar \psi^\mu \gamma^\sigma \psi_\sigma)]$$

that arises in the second-order action of pure $\mathcal N=1$ supergravity after the torsion tensor has been substituted into the first-order action.

== Properties ==
=== Supersymmetry transformation rules ===
The supersymmetry transformation rules, up to three-fermion terms which are unimportant for most applications, (Note: The three fermion terms in the supersymmetry transformations can be found elsewhere.) are given by

$$\delta e^a_\mu = \tfrac{1}{2}\bar \epsilon \gamma^a\psi_\mu,$$
$$\delta \phi^m = \tfrac{1}{\sqrt 2}\bar \epsilon_L \chi_L^m,$$
$$\delta A^I_\mu = -\tfrac{1}{2}\bar \epsilon \gamma_\mu \lambda^I,$$
$$\delta \psi_{\mu L} = \mathcal D_\mu \epsilon_L + \gamma_\mu S \epsilon_R,$$
$$\delta \chi^m_L = \tfrac{1}{\sqrt 2}\hat{\partial\!\!\!/}\phi^m \epsilon_R + \mathcal N^m \epsilon_L,$$
$$\delta \lambda_L^I = \tfrac{1}{4}\gamma^{\mu\nu}F_{\mu\nu}^I \epsilon_L + N^I \epsilon_L,$$

where

$$S = \tfrac{1}{2M_P^2} e^{K/2M_P^2}W,$$
$$\mathcal N^m = -\tfrac{1}{\sqrt 2} g^{m\bar n} e^{K/2M_P^2} \mathcal D_{\bar n}\bar W,$$
$$N^I = \tfrac{i}{2}D^I,$$

are known as fermionic shifts. It is a general feature of supergravity theories that fermionic shifts fix the form of the potential. In this case they can be used to express the potential as

$$V(\phi,\bar \phi) = -12 M_P^2 S\bar S + 2 g_{m \bar n}\mathcal N^m \mathcal N^{\bar n} +2 \text{Re}(f_{IJ})N^I \bar N^{J},$$

showing that the fermionic shifts from the matter fields gives a positive-definite contribution, while the gravitino gives a negative definite contribution.

=== Spontaneous symmetry breaking ===
A vacuum state used in many applications of supergravity is that of a maximally symmetric spacetime with no fermionic condensate. The case when fermionic condensates are present can be dealt with similarly by instead considering the effective field theory below the condensation scale where the condensate is now described by the presence of another scalar field. There are three types of maximally symmetric spacetimes, those being de Sitter, Minkowski, and anti-de Sitter spacetimes, with these distinguished by the sign of the cosmological constant, which in supergravity at the classical level is equivalent to the sign of the scalar potential.

Supersymmetry is preserved if all supersymmetric variations of fermionic fields vanish in the vacuum state. Since the maximally symmetric spacetime under consideration has a constant scalar field and a vanishing gauge field, (Note: The scalar field must be constant in both space and time to ensure maximal symmetry, while the gauge field must vanish since otherwise the vectorial nature of the field would also break spacetime symmetry.) the variation of the chiralini and gluini imply that $\langle \mathcal N^m\rangle = \langle N^I\rangle = 0$. (Note: Here the expectation value means that we are evaluating these quantities in the vacuum state.) This is equivalently to the condition that $\langle \mathcal D_m W\rangle = \langle \mathcal D^I\rangle = 0$. From the form of the scalar potential it follows that one can only have a supersymmetric vacuum if $V\leq 0$. Additionally, supersymmetric Minkowski spacetime occurs if and only if the superpotential also vanishes $\langle W\rangle = 0$. However, having a Minkowski or an anti-de Sitter solution does not necessarily imply that the vacuum is supersymmetric. An important feature of supersymmetic solutions in anti-de Sitter spacetime is that they satisfy the Breitenlohner–Freedman bound and are therefore stable with respect to fluctuations of the scalar fields, a feature that is present in other supergravity theories as well.

Supergravity provides a useful mechanism for spontaneous symmetry breaking of supersymmetry known as gravity mediation. This setup has a hidden and an observable sector that have no renormalizable couplings between them, meaning that they fully decouple from each other in the global supersymmetry $M_P\rightarrow \infty$ limit. In this scenario, supersymmetry breaking occurs in the hidden sector, with this transmitted to the observable sector only through nonrenormalizable terms, resulting in soft supersymmetry breaking in the visible sector, meaning that no quadratic divergences are introduced. One of the earliest and simplest models of gravity mediation is the Polonyi model. Other notable spontaneous symmetry breaking mechanism are anomaly mediation and gauge mediation, in which the tree-level soft terms generated from gravity mediation are themselves subdominant.

=== Super-Higgs mechanism ===
The supercurrent Lagrangian terms consists in part of bilinear fermion terms mixing the gravitino with the other fermions. These terms can be expressed as

$$\mathcal L_{\text{supercurrent}} \supset -\bar \psi_\mu \gamma^\mu v_L + h.c.$$

where $v_L$ is the supergravity generalization of the global supersymmetry goldstino field

$$v_L = -\tfrac{1}{\sqrt 2} \chi^m_L e^{K/2M_P^2}\mathcal D_m W-\tfrac{1}{2}i \lambda_L^I\mathcal P_I.$$

This field transforms under supersymmetry transformations as $\delta v_L =\tfrac{1}{2}V_+\epsilon_L+\cdots$, where $V_+$ is the positive part of the scalar potential. When supersymmetry is spontaneously broken $V_+>0$, then one can always choose a gauge where $v=0$, in which case the terms mixing the gravitino with the other fermions drops out. The only remaining fermion bilinear term involving the gravitino is the quadratic gravitino term in $\mathcal L_{\text{mass}}$. When the final spacetime is Minkowski spacetime, (Note: The mechanism works identically in curved spacetimes, however one cannot directly interpret the quadratic gravitino term as a regular mass term since mass is an ill-defined concept in curved spacetimes.) this bilinear term corresponds to a mass for the gravitino with a value of

$$m_{3/2} = \tfrac{1}{M_P^2}e^{K/2M_P^2}W.$$

An implication of this procedure when calculating the mass of the remaining fermions is that the gauge fixing transformation for the goldstino leads to additional shift contributions to the mass matrix for the chiral and gauge fermions, which have to be included.

=== Mass sum rules ===
The supertrace sum of the squares of the mass matrix eigenvalues gives valuable information about the mass spectra of particles in supergravity. The general formula is most compactly written in the superspace formalism, but in the special case of a vanishing cosmological constant, a trivial gauge kinetic matrix $f_{IJ}=\delta_{IJ}$, and $n_c$ chiral multiplets, it is given by

$$\text{str}(\mathcal M^2) = \sum_J (-1)^{2J}(2J+1)m_J^2$$
$$= (n_c-1)\bigg(2|m_{3/2}|^2-\frac{1}{M_P^2}\mathcal P^I\mathcal P_I\bigg) + 2e^{K/2M_P^2}R^{m\bar n}\mathcal D_m W \mathcal D_{\bar n}\bar W + 2i D^I \nabla_m \xi_I^m,$$

which is the supergravity generalization of the corresponding result in global supersymmetry. One important implication is that generically scalars have masses of order of the gravitino mass while fermionic masses can remain small.

=== No-scale models ===
No-scale models are models with a vanishing F-term, achieved by picking a Kähler potential and superpotential such that

$$g^{m\bar n} (\mathcal D_m W)(\mathcal D_{\bar n}\bar W) = \frac{3|W|^2}{M_P^2}.$$

When D-terms for gauge multiplets are ignored, this gives rise to the vanishing of the classical potential, which is said to have flat directions for all values of the scalar field. Additionally, supersymmetry is formally broken, indicated by a non-vanishing but undetermined mass of the gravitino. When moving beyond the classical level, quantum corrections come in to break this degeneracy, fixing the mass of the gravitino. The tree-level flat directions are useful in pheonomenological applications of supergravity in cosmology where even after lifting the flat directions, the slope is usually relatively small, a feature useful for building inflationary potentials. No-scale models also commonly occur in string theory compactifications.

=== Quantum effects ===
Quantizing supergravity introduces additional subtleties. In particular, for supergravity to be consistent as a quantum theory, new constraints come in such as anomaly cancellation conditions and black hole charge quantization. Quantum effects can also play an important role in many scenarios where they can contribute dominant effects, such as when quantum contributions lift flat directions. The nonrenormalizability of four-dimensional supergravity also implies that it should be seen as an effective field theory of some UV theory.

Quantum gravity is expected to have no exact global symmetries, which forbids constant Fayet–Iliopoulos terms as these can only arise if there are exact unbroken global $\text{U}(1)$ symmetries. This is seen in string theory compactifications, which can at most produce field dependent Fayet–Iliopoulos terms associated to Stueckelberg masses for gauged $\text{U}(1)$ symmetries.

== Related theories ==
A globally supersymmetric 4D $\mathcal N=1$ theory can be acquired from its supergravity generalization through the decoupling of gravity by rescaling the gravitino $\psi_\mu \rightarrow \psi_\mu/M_P$ and taking the Planck mass to infinity $M_P \rightarrow \infty$. The pure supergravity theory is meanwhile acquired by having no chiral or gauge multiplets. Additionally, a more general version of 4D $\mathcal N=1$ supergravity exists that also includes Chern–Simon terms.

Unlike in global supersymmetry, where all extended supersymmetry models can be constructed as special cases of the $\mathcal N=1$ theory, extended supergravity models are not merely special cases of the $\mathcal N=1$ theory. For example, in $\mathcal N=2$ supergravity the relevant scalar manifold must be a quaternionic Kähler manifold. But since these manifolds are not themselves Kähler manifolds, they cannot occur as special cases of the $\mathcal N=1$ supergravity scalar manifold.

Four-dimensional $\mathcal N=1$ supergravity plays a significant role in Beyond the Standard Model physics, being especially relevant in string theory, where it is the resulting effective theory in many compactifications. For example, since compactification on a 6-dimensional Calabi–Yau manifold breaks 3/4ths of the initial supersymmetry, compactification of heterotic strings on such manifolds gives an $\mathcal N=1$ supergravity, while the compactification of type II string theories gives an $\mathcal N=2$ supergravity. But if the type II theories are instead compactified on a Calabi–Yau orientifold, which breaks even more of the supersymmetry, the result is also an $\mathcal N=1$ supergravity. Similarly, compactification of M-theory on a $G_2$ manifold also results in an $\mathcal N=1$ supergravity. In all these theories, the particular properties of the resulting supergravity theory such as the Kähler potential and the superpotential are fixed by the geometry of the compact manifold.
