= 3D mirror symmetry =

Equivalence in 3D quantum field theory

In theoretical physics, 3D mirror symmetry is a principle, or duality, that proposes a surprising equivalence between two different three-dimensional quantum field theories. The two theories appear to describe different physics, but are in fact identical. This is like having two different instruction manuals that result in building the same object; a difficult step in one manual might correspond to an easy step in the other.

The duality is a powerful tool because a problem that is very difficult to solve in one theory may be simple to solve in its "mirror" version. Specifically, this symmetry applies to three-dimensional gauge theories with a property known as $N=4$ supersymmetry (meaning they have eight supercharges). It is a version of mirror symmetry that relates the moduli spaces of these theories.

The principle was first proposed by Kenneth Intriligator and Nathan Seiberg in 1996. They showed that for a pair of mirror theories, the moduli space of each theory is swapped. Specifically, what is known as the Coulomb branch of one theory is the Higgs branch of the other, and vice versa. This relationship was soon given a physical interpretation in string theory by Amihay Hanany and Edward Witten, who demonstrated that it is a consequence of S-duality in type IIB string theory.

== Extensions ==
Four months after its creation, 3D mirror symmetry was extended to $N=2$ gauge theories resulting from supersymmetry breaking in $N=4$ theories. Here, it was given a physical interpretation in terms of vortices. In 3-dimensional gauge theories, vortices are particles. BPS vortices, which are those vortices that preserve some supersymmetry, have masses which are given by the FI term of the gauge theory. In particular, on the Higgs branch, where the squarks are massless and condense yielding nontrivial vacuum expectation values (VEVs), the vortices are massive. On the other hand, Intriligator and Seiberg interpret the Coulomb branch of the gauge theory, where the scalar in the vector multiplet has a VEV, as being the regime where massless vortices condense. Thus the duality between the Coulomb branch in one theory and the Higgs branch in the dual theory is the duality between squarks and vortices.

In this theory, the instantons are 't Hooft–Polyakov magnetic monopoles whose actions are proportional to the VEV of the scalar in the vector multiplet. In this case, instanton calculations again reproduce the nonperturbative superpotential. In particular, in the $N=4$ case with SU(2) gauge symmetry, the metric on the moduli space was found by Nathan Seiberg and Edward Witten using holomorphy and supersymmetric nonrenormalization theorems several days before Intriligator and Seiberg's 3-dimensional mirror symmetry paper appeared. Their results were reproduced using standard instanton techniques.
