= Gaugino condensation =

Nonzero gaugino vacuum expectation value in supersymmetry

In quantum field theory, gaugino condensation is the nonzero vacuum expectation value in some models of a bilinear expression constructed in theories with supersymmetry from the superpartner of a gauge boson called the gaugino. The gaugino and the bosonic gauge field and the D-term are all components of a supersymmetric vector superfield in the Wess–Zumino gauge.

$$\langle \lambda^a_\alpha \lambda^b_\beta\rangle \sim \delta^{ab}\epsilon_{\alpha\beta}\Lambda^3$$

where $\lambda$ represents the gaugino field (a spinor) and $\Lambda$ is an energy scale, a and b represent Lie algebra indices and α and β represent van der Waerden (two component spinor) indices. The mechanism is somewhat analogous to chiral symmetry breaking and is an example of a fermionic condensate.

In the superfield notation, $W_\alpha \equiv \overline{D}^2 D_\alpha V$ is the gauge field strength and is a chiral superfield.

$$\langle W^a_\alpha W^b_\beta \rangle = \langle \lambda^a_\alpha \lambda^b_\beta\rangle \sim \delta^{ab}\epsilon_{\alpha\beta}\Lambda^3$$

$W_\alpha W_\beta$ is also a chiral superfield and we see that what acquires a nonzero VEV is not the F-term of this chiral superfield. Because of this, gaugino condensation in and of itself does not lead to supersymmetry breaking. If we also have supersymmetry breaking, it is caused by something other than the gaugino condensate.

However, a gaugino condensate definitely breaks U(1)_{R} symmetry as $\lambda^a_\alpha \lambda^b_\beta$ has an R-charge of 2.

== See also ==
- Tachyon condensation
