= 4D N = 1 global supersymmetry =

Theory of supersymmetry in four dimensions

In supersymmetry, 4D $\mathcal N = 1$ global supersymmetry is the theory of global supersymmetry in four dimensions with a single supercharge. It consists of an arbitrary number of chiral and vector supermultiplets whose possible interactions are strongly constrained by supersymmetry, with the theory primarily fixed by three functions: the Kähler potential, the superpotential, and the gauge kinetic matrix. Many common models of supersymmetry are special cases of this general theory, such as the Wess–Zumino model, $\mathcal N=1$ super Yang–Mills theory, and the Minimal Supersymmetric Standard Model. When gravity is included, the result is described by 4D $\mathcal N = 1$ supergravity.

== Background ==
Global $\mathcal N=1$ supersymmetry has a spacetime symmetry algebra given by the super-Poincaré algebra with a single supercharge. In four dimensions this supercharge can be expressed either as a pair of Weyl spinors or as a single Majorana spinor. The particle content of this theory must belong to representations of the super-Poincaré algebra, known as supermultiplets. Without including gravity, there are two types of supermultiplets: a chiral supermultiplet consisting of a complex scalar field and its Majorana spinor superpartner, and a vector supermultiplet consisting of a gauge field along with its Majorana spinor superpartner.

The general theory has an arbitrary number of chiral multiplets $(\phi^n,\chi^n)$ indexed by $n$, along with an arbitrary number of gauge multiplets $(A^I_\mu, \lambda^I)$ indexed by $I$. Here $\phi^n$ are complex scalar fields, $A^I_\mu$ are gauge fields, and $\chi^n$ and $\lambda^I$ are Majorana spinors known as chiralini and gaugini, respectively. Supersymmetry imposes stringent conditions on the way that the supermultiplets can be combined in the theory. In particular, most of the structure is fixed by three arbitrary functions of the scalar fields. The dynamics of the chiral multiplets is fixed by the holomorphic superpotential $W(\phi)$ and the Kähler potential $K(\phi,\bar \phi)$, while the mixing between the chiral and gauge sectors is primarily fixed by the holomorphic gauge kinetic matrix $f_{IJ}(\phi)$. When such mixing occurs, the gauge group must also be consistent with the structure of the chiral sector.

=== Scalar manifold geometry ===
The complex scalar fields in the $n_c$ chiral supermultiplets can be seen as coordinates of a $2n_c$-dimensional manifold, known as the scalar manifold. This manifold can be parametrized using complex coordinates $(\phi^n, \phi^{\bar n})$, where the barred index represents the complex conjugate $\phi^{\bar n} = (\phi^n)^*$. Supersymmetry ensures that the manifold is necessarily a complex manifold, which is a type of manifold that locally looks like $\mathbb C^{n_c}$ and whose transition functions are holomorphic. This is because supersymmetry transformations map $\phi^n$ into left-handed Weyl spinors, and $\phi^{\bar n}$ into right-handed Weyl spinors, so the geometry of the scalar manifold must reflect the fermion spacetime chirality by admitting an appropriate decomposition into complex coordinates. (Note: To see that the manifold must be a complex manifold, consider a general coordinate redefinition starting with a holomorphic field $\phi^n \rightarrow \varphi^n(\phi, \bar \phi)$. Since this is a mere redefinition of variables, it should not affect any physical quantities such as chirality. The super-Poincaré algebra implies the supersymmetry variation of the scalars to be $\delta_s \phi^n = \bar \epsilon_L \chi_L^n$ and $\delta_s \phi^{\bar n} = \epsilon_R \chi_R^{\bar n}$, which differ by the chirality. However, a supersymmetry variation of the general coordinate redefinition is given by $\delta_s \varphi = \delta_s \phi^m \partial_m \varphi^n + \delta_s \phi^{\bar m} \partial_{\bar m} \varphi^n$, where the second term can introduce a right-handed Weyl fermion even if originally one started with a scalar field corresponding to a left-handed Weyl fermion $\phi^n$. To avoid this requires the transition map to be holomorphic $\partial_{\bar m}\varphi^n =0$, implying a complex manifold.)

For any complex manifold there always exists a special metric compatible with the manifolds complex structure, known as a Hermitian metric. The only non-zero components of this metric are $g_{m\bar n}$, with a line element given by

$$ds^2 = g_{m\bar n}(d\phi^m \otimes d\phi^{\bar n} + d\phi^{\bar n}\otimes d\phi^m).$$

Using this metric on the scalar manifold makes it a Hermitian manifold. The chirality properties inherited from supersymmetry imply that any closed loop around the scalar manifold has to maintain the splitting between $\phi^n$ and $\phi^{\bar n}$. This implies that the manifold has a $\text{U}(N)$ holonomy group. Such manifolds are known as Kähler manifolds and can alternatively be defined as being manifolds that admit a two-form, known as a Kähler form, defined by

$$\Omega = i g_{m\bar n} d\phi^m \wedge d\phi^{\bar n}$$

such that $d\Omega = 0$. This also implies that the scalar manifold is a symplectic manifold. These manifolds have the useful property that their metric can be expressed in terms of a function known as a Kähler potential $K(\phi, \bar \phi)$ through

$$g_{m\bar n} = \partial_m \partial_{\bar n} K,$$

where this function is invariant up to the addition of the real part of an arbitrary holomorphic function

$$K(\phi, \bar \phi) \rightarrow K(\phi, \bar \phi) + h(\phi) + h^*(\bar \phi).$$

Such transformations are known as Kähler transformations and since they do not affect the geometry of the scalar manifold, any supersymmetric action must be invariant under these transformations.

=== Coupling the chiral and gauge sectors ===
The gauge group of a general supersymmetric theory is heavily restricted by the interactions of the theory. One key condition arises when chiral multiplets are charged under the gauge group, in which case the gauge transformation must be such as to leave the geometry of the scalar manifold unchanged. More specifically, they leave the scalar metric as well as the complex structure unchanged. The first condition implies that the gauge symmetry belongs to the isometry group of the scalar manifold, while the second further restricts them to be holomorphic Killing symmetries. Therefore, the gauge group must be a subgroup of this symmetry group, although additional consistency conditions can restrict the possible gauge groups further.

The generators of the isometry group are known as Killing vectors, with these being vectors that preserve the metric, a condition mathematically expressed by the Killing equation $\mathcal L_{\xi_I}g = 0$, where $\mathcal L_{\xi_I}$ are the Lie derivatives for the corresponding vector. The isometry algebra is then the algebra of these Killing vectors

$$[\xi_I, \xi_J] = f_{IJ}{}^K \xi_K,$$

where $f_{IJ}{}^K$ are the structure constants. Not all of these Killing vectors can necessarily be gauged. Rather, the Kähler structure of the scalar manifolds also demands the preservation of the complex structure $\mathcal L_{\xi_I}J = 0$, (Note: Any complex manifold has a tensor field $J$ satisfying $J^2=-1$, which defines its almost complex structure.) with this imposing that the Killing vectors must also be holomorphic functions $\xi_I^{\bar n}(\bar\phi) = (\xi_I^n(\phi))^*$. It is these holomorphic Killing vectors that define symmetries of Kähler manifolds, and so a gauge group can only be formed by gauging a subset of these.

An implication of $\mathcal L_{\xi_I} J = 0$ is that there exists a set of real holomorphic functions known as Killing prepotentials $\mathcal P_I$ which satisfy $i_{\xi_I} J = d \mathcal P_I$, where $i_{\xi_I}$ is the interior product. The Killing prepotentials entirely fix the holomorphic Killing vectors

$$\xi^m_I = -ig^{m\bar n}\partial_{\bar n}\mathcal P_I.$$

Conversely, if the holomorphic Killing vectors are known, then the prepotential can be explicitly written in terms of the Kähler potential as

$\mathcal P_J = \frac{i}{2}[\xi^m_I \partial_m K - \xi_I^{\bar n}\partial_{\bar n}K - (r_I-r_I^*)].$

The holomorphic functions $r_I(\phi)$ describe how the Kähler potential changes under isometry transformations $\delta_I K \equiv r_I+r_I^*$, allowing them to be calculated up to the addition of an imaginary constant.

A key consistency condition on the prepotentials is that they must satisfy the equivariance condition

$$\xi_I^mg_{m\bar n}\xi_J^{\bar n} - \xi_J^mg_{m\bar n}\xi_I^{\bar n} = if_{IJ}{}^K \mathcal P_K.$$

For non-abelian symmetries, this condition fixes the imaginary constants associated to the holomorphic functions $r_I -r_I^* = -i\eta_I$, known as Fayet–Iliopoulos terms. For abelian subalgebras of the gauge algebra, the Fayet–Iliopoulos terms remain unfixed since these have vanishing structure constants.

== Lagrangian ==
The derivatives in the Lagrangian are covariant with respect to the symmetries under which the fields transform, these being the gauge symmetries and the scalar manifold coordinate redefinition transformations. (Note: The chiralino behaves as a vector on the scalar manifold.) The various covariant derivatives are given by

$$\hat \partial_\mu \phi^n = \partial_\mu \phi^n - A^I_\mu \xi_I^n,$$
$$\hat{\partial}_\mu\lambda^I = \partial_\mu \lambda^I + A^J_\mu f^I_{JK}\lambda^K,$$
$$\hat{\mathcal D}_\mu \chi^m_L = \partial_\mu\chi^m_L + (\hat \partial_\mu \phi^n)\Gamma^m_{nl} \chi^l_L - A^I_\mu (\partial_n \xi^m_I)\chi^n_L,$$

where the hat indicates that the derivative is covariant with respect to gauge transformations. Here $\xi_I^m(\phi)$ are the holomorphic Killing vectors that have been gauged, while $\Gamma^m_{nl} = g^{m\bar p}\partial_n g_{l \bar p}$ are the scalar manifold Christoffel symbols and $f_{JK}{}^I$ are the gauge algebra structure constants. Additionally, second derivatives on the scalar manifold must also be covariant $\mathcal D_m \partial_n = \partial_m \partial_n - \Gamma^l_{mn}\partial_l$. Meanwhile, the left-handed and right-handed Weyl fermion projections of the Majorana spinors are denoted by $\chi_{L,R} = P_{L,R}\chi$.

The general four-dimensional Lagrangian with global $\mathcal N=1$ supersymmetry is given by

$$\mathcal L = -g_{m\bar n}\bigg[\hat \partial_\mu \phi^m \hat \partial^\mu \phi^{\bar n} +\bar \chi_L^{m}\hat{{\mathcal D}\!\!\!/}\chi^{\bar n}_R + \bar \chi_R^{\bar n}\hat{{{\mathcal D}\!\!\!/}}\chi^{m}_L\bigg]$$
$$+ \text{Re}(f_{IJ})\bigg[-\frac{1}{4}F^I_{\mu\nu}F^{\mu\nu J} - \frac{1}{2}\bar \lambda^I \hat{{\partial\!\!\!/}}\lambda^J\bigg]$$
$$+ \frac{1}{8}(\text{Im} f_{IJ})\bigg[F_{\mu\nu}^I F_{\rho \sigma}^J \epsilon^{\mu\nu\rho\sigma}-2i \hat{\partial}_\mu(\bar \lambda^I \gamma_5 \gamma^\mu \lambda^J)\bigg]$$
$$-\bigg[\frac{1}{4\sqrt 2}\partial_m f_{IJ}F^I_{\mu\nu}\bar \chi^m_L \gamma^{\mu\nu}\lambda^J_L + h.c.\bigg]$$
$$+ \bigg[ -\frac{1}{2}m_{mn}\bar \chi^m_L \chi^n_L - m_{n I}\bar \chi^n_L\lambda_L^I -\frac{1}{2}m_{IJ}\bar \lambda^I_L \lambda^J_L +h.c.\bigg]$$
$$- V(\phi^m, \phi^n) + \mathcal L_{4f}.$$

The first line is the kinetic term for the chiral multiplets whose structure is primarily fixed by the scalar metric while the second line is the kinetic term for the gauge multiplets which is instead primarily fixed by the real part of the holomorphic gauge kinetic matrix $f_{IJ}(\phi)$. The third line is the generalized supersymmetric theta-like term for the gauge multiplet, with this being a total derivative when the imaginary part of the gauge kinetic function is a constant, in which case it does not contribute to the equations of motion. The next line is an interaction term while the second-to-last line are the fermion mass terms given by

$$m_{mn} = \mathcal D_m \partial_n W, \ \ \ \ \ m_{IJ} = -\frac{1}{2}\partial_n f_{IJ} \partial^n \bar W,$$
$$m_{nI} = m_{In} = i\sqrt 2 \bigg[\partial_n \mathcal P_I - \frac{1}{4}\partial_n f_{IJ}D^J\bigg],$$

where $W(\phi)$ is the superpotential, an arbitrary holomorphic function of the scalars, and $D^I = (\text{Re} f)^{-1 IJ} \mathcal P_J$ are the so-called D-terms. It is these terms that determine the masses of the fermions since in a particular vacuum state with scalar fields expanded around some value $\phi = \phi_0 + \phi'$, then the mass matrices become fixed matrices to leading order in the scalar field. Higher order terms give rise to interaction terms between the scalars and the fermions. The mass basis will generally involve diagonalizing the entire mass matrix implying that the mass eigenbasis are generally linear combinations of the chiral and gauge fermion fields.

The last line includes the scalar potential

$$V = g^{m\bar n}\partial_m W \partial_{\bar n}\bar W + \frac{1}{2}\text{Re} (f_{IJ}) D^I D^J,$$

where the first term is called the F-term potential and the second is known as the D-term potential. (Note: As is the case in all supersymmetric theories, the structure of this potential is fixed by the fermion shifts, which determine how fermions change under supersymmetry transformations.) Finally this line also contains the four-fermion interaction terms

$$\mathcal L_{4f} = \bigg[ \frac{1}{8}(\mathcal D_m \partial_n f_{IJ})\bar \chi^m \chi^n \bar \lambda^I \lambda^J_L + h.c.\bigg] + \frac{1}{4}R_{m \bar n p \bar q} \bar \chi^m \chi^p \bar \chi^{\bar n} \chi^{\bar q}$$
$$-\frac{1}{16}\partial_mf_{IJ}\bar \lambda^I \lambda^J_L g^{m\bar n}\bar \partial_{\bar n}\bar f_{KL}\bar \lambda^K \lambda^L_R$$
$$+ \frac{1}{16} (\text{Re} f)^{-1 \ IJ}(\partial_m f_{IN} \bar \chi^m - \partial_{\bar m}\bar f_{IN}\bar \chi^{\bar m})\lambda^N (\partial_n f_{JM}\bar \chi^{n}- \partial_{\bar n}\bar f_{JM}\bar \chi^{\bar n})\lambda^M,$$

with $R_{m\bar n p\bar q}$ is the Riemann tensor of the scalar manifold.

== Properties ==
=== Supersymmetry transformations ===
Neglecting three-fermion terms, the supersymmetry transformation rules that leave the Lagrangian invariant are given by

$$\delta \phi^m = \frac{1}{\sqrt 2}\bar \epsilon \chi^m,$$
$$\delta \chi_L^m = \frac{1}{\sqrt 2}\hat{{\partial\!\!\!/}} \phi^m \epsilon_R -\frac{1}{\sqrt 2}g^{m\bar n}(\partial_{\bar n}\bar W)\epsilon_L,$$
$$\delta A^I_\mu = -\frac{1}{2}\bar \epsilon \gamma_\mu \lambda^I,$$
$$\delta \lambda^I_L = \frac{1}{4}\gamma^{\mu\nu}F^I_{\mu\nu}\epsilon_L + \frac{i}{2}D^I \epsilon_L.$$

The second part of the fermion transformations, proportional to $\partial_{\bar n}\bar W$ for the chiralino and $D^I$ for the gaugino, are referred to as fermion shifts. These dictate a lot of the physical properties of the supersymmetry model such as the form of the potential and the goldstino when supersymmetry is spontaneously broken.

=== Spontaneous symmetry breaking ===
At the quantum level, supersymmetry is broken if the supercharges do not annihilate the vacuum $Q_\alpha |0\rangle \neq 0$. Since the Hamiltonian can be written in terms of these supercharges, this implies that unbroken supersymmetry corresponds to vanishing vacuum energy, while broken supersymmetry necessarily requires positive vacuum energy. In contrast to supergravity, global supersymmetry does not admit negative vacuum energies, with this being a direct consequence of the supersymmetry algebra.

In the classical approximation, supersymmetry is unbroken if the scalar potential vanishes, which is equivalent to the condition that

$$\partial_m W(\phi) = 0, \ \ \ \ \ \ \ \mathcal P_I(\phi, \bar \phi) = 0.$$

If any of these are non-zero, then supersymmetry is classically broken. Due to the superpotential nonrenormalization theorem, which states that the superpotential does not receive corrections at any level of quantum perturbation theory, the above condition holds at all orders of quantum perturbation theory. Only non-perturbative quantum corrections can modify the condition for supersymmetry breaking.

Spontaneous symmetry breaking of global supersymmetry necessarily leads to the presence of a massless Nambu–Goldstone fermion, referred to as a goldstino $v$. This fermion is given by the linear combination of the fermion fields multiplied by their fermion shifts and contracted with appropriate metrics

$$v_L = -\frac{1}{\sqrt 2} P_L\bigg[\partial_n W \chi^n + \frac{1}{\sqrt 2} i \mathcal P_I \lambda^I\bigg],$$

with this being the eigenvector corresponding to the zero eigenvalue of the fermion mass matrix. The goldstino vanishes when the conditions for supersymmetry are met, that being the vanishing of the superpotential and the prepotential.

=== Mass sum rules ===
One important set of quantities are the supertraces of powers of the mass matrices $\mathcal M$, usually expressed as a sum over all the eigenvalues $m_J$ modified by the spin $J$ of the state

$$\text{str}(\mathcal M^{n}) = \sum_J (-1)^{2J}(2J+1)m_J^{n}.$$

In unbroken global $\mathcal N=1$ supersymmetry, $\text{str}( \mathcal M^n) = 0$ for all $n$. The $n=2$ case is referred to as the mass sum formula, which in the special case of a trivial gauge kinetic matrix $f_{IJ}=\delta_{IJ}$ can be expressed as

$$\text{str}(\mathcal M^2) = \sum_J (-1)^{2J}(2J+1)m_J^2 = 2R^{m\bar n}\partial_m W \partial_{\bar n}\bar W + 2i D^I \nabla_m \xi_I^m,$$

showing that this vanishes in the case of a Ricci-flat scalar manifold, unless spontaneous symmetry breaking occurs through non-vanishing D-terms. For most models $\text{str}(\mathcal M^2)=0$, even when supersymmetry is spontaneously broken. An implication of this is that the mass difference between bosons and fermions cannot be very large. The result can be generalized variously, such as for vanishing vacuum energy but a general gauge kinetic term, or even to a general formula using the superspace formalism. In the full quantum theory the masses can get additional quantum corrections so the above results only hold at tree-level.

== Special cases and generalizations ==
A theory with only chiral multiplets and no gauge multiplets is sometimes referred to as the supersymmetric sigma model, with this determined by the Kähler potential and the superpotential. From this, the Wess–Zumino model is acquired by restricting to a trivial Kähler potential corresponding to a Euclidean metric, together with a superpotential that is at most cubic

$$W(\phi) = \frac{1}{2}m\phi^2 + \frac{1}{3}\lambda \phi^3.$$

This model has the useful property of being fully renormalizable.

If instead there are no chiral multiplets, then the theory with a Euclidean gauge kinetic matrix $f_{IJ}= \delta_{IJ}$ is known as super Yang–Mills theory. In the case of a single gauge multiplet with a $\text{U}(1)$ gauge group, this corresponds to super Maxwell theory. Super quantum chromodynamics is meanwhile acquired using a Euclidean scalar metric, together with an arbitrary number of chiral multiplets behaving as matter and a single gauge multiplet. (Note: Super quantum chromodynamics is sometimes further restricted to only have a renormalizable superpotential.) When the gauge group is an abelian group this is referred to a super quantum electrodynamics.

Models with extended supersymmetry $\mathcal N\geq 2$ arise as special cases of $\mathcal N=1$ supersymmetry models with particular choices of multiplets, potentials, and kinetic terms. This is in contrast to supergravity where extended supergravity models are not special cases of $\mathcal N=1$ supergravity and necessarily include additional structures that must be added to the theory.

Gauging global supersymmetry gives rise to local supersymmetry which is equivalent to supergravity. In particular, 4D N = 1 supergravity has a matter content similar with the case of global supersymmetry except with the addition of a single gravity supermultiplet, consisting of a graviton and a gravitino. The resulting action requires a number of modifications to account for the coupling to gravity, although structurally shares many similarities with the case of global supersymmetry. The global supersymmetry model can be directly acquired from its supergravity generalization through the decoupling limit whereby the Planck mass is taken to infinity $M_P \rightarrow \infty$.

These models are also applied in particle physics to construct supersymmetric generalizations of the Standard Model, most notably the Minimal Supersymmetric Standard Model. This is the minimal extension of the Standard Model that is consistent with phenomenology and includes supersymmetry that is broken at some high scale.

== Construction ==
There are a number of ways to construct a four dimensional global $\mathcal N=1$ supersymmetric action. The most common approach is the superspace approach. In this approach, Minkowski spacetime is extended to an eight-dimensional supermanifold which additionally has four Grassmann coordinates. The chiral and vector multiplets are then packaged into fields known as superfields. The supersymmetry action is subsequently constructed by considering general invariant actions of the superfields and integrating over the Grassmann subspace to get a four-dimensional Lagrangian in Minkowski spacetime.

An alternative approach to the superspace formalism is the multiplet calculus approach. Rather than working with superfields, this approach works with multiplets, which are sets of fields on which the supersymmetry algebra is realized. Invariant actions are then constructed from these. For global supersymmetry this is more complicated than the superspace approach, although a generalized approach is very useful when constructing supergravity actions.
