= Moduli (physics) =

Space of vacuum states

In quantum field theory, the term moduli (sg.: modulus; more properly moduli fields) is sometimes used to refer to scalar fields whose potential energy function has continuous families of global minima. Such potential functions frequently occur in supersymmetric systems. The term "modulus" is borrowed from mathematics (or more specifically, moduli space is borrowed from algebraic geometry), where it is used synonymously with "parameter". The word moduli (Moduln in German) first appeared in 1857 in Bernhard Riemann's celebrated paper "Theorie der Abel'schen Functionen".

== Moduli spaces in quantum field theories ==
In quantum field theories, the possible vacua are usually labeled by the vacuum expectation values of scalar fields, as Lorentz invariance forces the vacuum expectation values of any higher spin fields to vanish. These vacuum expectation values can take any value for which the potential function is a minimum. Consequently, when the potential function has continuous families of global minima, the space of vacua for the quantum field theory is a manifold (or orbifold), usually called the vacuum manifold. This manifold is often called the moduli space of vacua, or just the moduli space, for short.

The term moduli is also used in string theory to refer to various continuous parameters that label possible string backgrounds: the expectation value of the dilaton field, the parameters (e.g. the radius and complex structure) which govern the shape of the compactification manifold, et cetera. These parameters are represented, in the quantum field theory that approximates the string theory at low energies, by the vacuum expectation values of massless scalar fields, making contact with the usage described above. In string theory, the term "moduli space" is often used specifically to refer to the space of all possible string backgrounds.

== Moduli spaces of supersymmetric gauge theories ==
In general quantum field theories, even if the classical potential energy is minimized over a large set of possible expectation values, once quantum corrections are included it is generically the case that nearly all of these configurations cease to minimize the energy. The result is that the set of vacua of the quantum theory is generally much smaller than that of the classical theory. A notable exception occurs when the various vacua in question are related by a symmetry which guarantees that their energy levels remain exactly degenerate.

The situation is very different in supersymmetric quantum field theories. In general, these possess large moduli spaces of vacua which are not related by any symmetry, for example, the masses of the various excitations may differ at various points on the moduli space. The moduli spaces of supersymmetric gauge theories are in general easier to calculate than those of nonsupersymmetric theories because supersymmetry restricts the allowed geometries of the moduli space even when quantum corrections are included.

=== Allowed moduli spaces of 4-dimensional theories ===
The more supersymmetry there is, the stronger the restriction on the vacuum manifold. Therefore, if a restriction appears below for a given number N of spinors of supercharges, then it also holds for all greater values of N.

==== N=1 Theories ====
The first restriction on the geometry of a moduli space was found in 1979 by Bruno Zumino and published in the article "Supersymmetry and Kähler Manifolds". He considered an N=1 theory in 4-dimensions with global supersymmetry. N=1 means that the fermionic components of the supersymmetry algebra can be assembled into a single Majorana supercharge. The only scalars in such a theory are the complex scalars of the chiral superfields. He found that the vacuum manifold of allowed vacuum expectation values for these scalars is not only complex but also a Kähler manifold.

If gravity is included in the theory, so that there is local supersymmetry, then the resulting theory is called a supergravity theory and the restriction on the geometry of the moduli space becomes stronger. The moduli space must not only be Kähler, but also the Kähler form must lift to integral cohomology. Such manifolds are called Hodge manifolds. The first example appeared in the 1979 article "Spontaneous Symmetry Breaking and Higgs Effect in Supergravity Without Cosmological Constant" and the general statement appeared 3 years later in "Quantization of Newton's Constant in Certain Supergravity Theories".

==== N=2 Theories ====
In extended 4-dimensional theories with N=2 supersymmetry, corresponding to a single Dirac spinor supercharge, the conditions are stronger. The N=2 supersymmetry algebra contains two representations with scalars, the vector multiplet which contains a complex scalar and the hypermultiplet which contains two complex scalars. The moduli space of the vector multiplets is called the Coulomb branch while that of the hypermultiplets is called the Higgs branch. The total moduli space is locally a product of these two branches, as nonrenormalization theorems imply that the metric of each is independent of the fields of the other multiplet.(See for example Argyres, Non-Perturbative Dynamics Of Four-Dimensional Supersymmetric Field Theories, pp. 6–7, for further discussion of the local product structure.)

In the case of global N=2 supersymmetry, in other words in the absence of gravity, the Coulomb branch of the moduli space is a special Kähler manifold. The first example of this restriction appeared in the 1984 article Potentials and Symmetries of General Gauged N=2 Supergravity: Yang-Mills Models by Bernard de Wit and Antoine Van Proeyen, while a general geometric description of the underlying geometry, called special geometry, was presented by Andrew Strominger in his 1990 paper Special Geometry.

The Higgs branch is a hyperkähler manifold as was shown by Luis Alvarez-Gaume and Daniel Freedman in their 1981 paper Geometrical Structure and Ultraviolet Finiteness in the Supersymmetric Sigma Model. Including gravity the supersymmetry becomes local. Then one needs to add the same Hodge condition to the special Kahler Coulomb branch as in the N=1 case. Jonathan Bagger and Edward Witten demonstrated in their 1982 paper Matter Couplings in N=2 Supergravity that in this case, the Higgs branch must be a quaternionic Kähler manifold.

==== N>2 Supersymmetry ====
In extended supergravities with N>2 the moduli space must always be a symmetric space.
