= Super QCD =

Supersymmetric generalization of quantum chromodynamics

In theoretical physics, super QCD is a supersymmetric gauge theory which resembles quantum chromodynamics (QCD) but contains additional particles and interactions which render it supersymmetric.

The most commonly used version of super QCD is in 4 dimensions and contains one Majorana spinor supercharge. The particle content consists of vector supermultiplets, which include gluons and gluinos and also chiral supermultiplets which contain quarks and squarks transforming in the fundamental representation of the gauge group. This theory has many features in common with real world QCD, for example in some phases it manifests confinement and chiral symmetry breaking. The supersymmetry of this theory means that, unlike QCD, one may use nonrenormalization theorems to analytically demonstrate the existence of these phenomena and even calculate the condensate which breaks the chiral symmetry.

== Phases of super QCD ==
Consider 4-dimensional SQCD with gauge group SU(N) and M flavors of chiral multiplets. The vacuum structure depends on M and N. The (spin-zero) squarks may be reorganized into hadrons, and the moduli space of vacua of the theory may be parametrized by their vacuum expectation values. On most of the moduli space the Higgs mechanism makes all of the fields massive, and so they may be integrated out. Classically, the resulting moduli space is singular. The singularities correspond to points where some gluons are massless, and so could not be integrated out. In the full quantum moduli space is nonsingular, and its structure depends on the relative values of M and N. For example, when M is less than or equal to N+1, the theory exhibits confinement.

When M is less than N, the effective action differs from the classical action. More precisely, while the perturbative nonrenormalization theory forbids any perturbative correction to the superpotential, the superpotential receives nonperturbative corrections. When N=M+1, these corrections result from a single instanton. For larger values of N the instanton calculation suffers from infrared divergences, however the correction may nonetheless be determined precisely from the gaugino condensation. The quantum correction to the superpotential was calculated in The Massless Limit Of Supersymmetric Qcd. If the chiral multiplets are massless, the resulting potential energy has no minimum and so the full quantum theory has no vacuum. Instead the fields roll forever to larger values.

When M is equal to or greater than N, the classical superpotential is exact. When M is equal to N, however, the moduli space receives quantum corrections from a single instanton. This correction renders the moduli space nonsingular, and also leads to chiral symmetry breaking. Then M is equal to N+1 the moduli space is not modified and so there is no chiral symmetry breaking, however there is still confinement.

When M is greater than N+1 but less than 3N/2, the theory is asymptotically free. However at low energies the theory becomes strongly coupled, and is better described by a Seiberg dual description in terms of magnetic variables with the same global flavor symmetry group but a new gauge symmetry SU(M-N). Notice that the gauge group is not an observable, but simply reflects the redundancy or a description and so may well differ in various dual theories, as it does in this case. On the other hand, the global symmetry group is an observable so it is essential that it is the same, SU(M), in both descriptions. The dual magnetic theory is free in the infrared, the coupling constant shrinks logarithmically, and so by the Dirac quantization condition the electric coupling constant grows logarithmically in the infrared. This implies that the potential between two electric charges, at long distances, scales as the logarithm of their distance divided by the distance.

When M is between 3N/2 and 3N, in the theory has an infrared fixed point where it becomes a nontrivial conformal field theory. The potential between electric charges obeys the usual Colomb law, it is inversely proportional to the distance between the charges.

When M is greater than 3N, the theory is free in the infrared, and so the force between two charges is inversely proportional to the product of the distance times the logarithm of the distance between the charges. However the theory is ill-defined in the ultraviolet, unless one includes additional heavy degrees of freedom which lead, for example, to a Seiberg dual theory of the type described above at N+1<M<3N/2.
