= Seiberg duality =

Renormalization group duality in supersymmetric gauge theories

In quantum field theory, Seiberg duality, conjectured by Nathan Seiberg in 1994, is an S-duality relating two different supersymmetric QCDs. The two theories are not identical, but they agree at low energies. More precisely under a renormalization group flow they flow to the same IR fixed point, and so are in the same universality class. It is an extension to nonabelian gauge theories with N=1 supersymmetry of Montonen–Olive duality in N=4 theories and electromagnetic duality in abelian theories.

== Statement ==
Seiberg duality is an equivalence of the IR fixed points in an N=1 theory with SU(N_{c}) as the gauge group and N_{f} flavors of fundamental chiral multiplets and N_{f} flavors of antifundamental chiral multiplets in the chiral limit (no bare masses) and an N=1 chiral QCD with N_{f}-N_{c} colors and N_{f} flavors, where N_{c} and N_{f} are positive integers satisfying

$$N_f>N_c+1$$.

A stronger version of the duality relates not only the chiral limit but also the full deformation space of the theory. In the special case in which

$${1\over 3}N_f < N_c < {2\over 3}N_f$$

the IR fixed point is a nontrivial interacting superconformal field theory. For a superconformal field theory, the anomalous scaling dimension of a chiral superfield $D=\frac{3}{2} R$ where R is the R-charge. This is an exact result.

The dual theory contains a fundamental "meson" chiral superfield M which is color neutral but transforms as a bifundamental under the flavor symmetries.

	SQCD	dual theory
color gauge group	$SU(N_c)$	$SU(N_f-N_c)$
global internal symmetries	$SU(N_f)_L \times SU(N_f)_R \times U(1)_B \times U(1)_R$	$SU(N_f)_L \times SU(N_f)_R \times U(1)_B \times U(1)_R$
chiral superfields	$Q\,(N_f,1)_{1/N_c,(N_f-N_c)/N_f}$	$\tilde{Q}\,(1,N_f)_{-1/(N_f-N_c),N_c/N_f}$
chiral superfields	$Q^c\,(1,\overline{N_f})_{-1/N_c,(N_f-N_c)/N_f}$	$\tilde{Q^c}\,(\overline{N_f},1)_{1/(N_f-N_c),N_c/N_f}$
chiral superfields		$M\,(N_f,\overline{N_f})_{0,2(N_f-N_c)/N_f}$

The dual theory contains the superpotential $W=\alpha M \tilde{Q^c}\tilde{Q}$.

== Relations between the original and dual theories ==
Being an S-duality, Seiberg duality relates the strong coupling regime with the weak coupling regime, and interchanges chromoelectric fields (gluons) with chromomagnetic fields (gluons of the dual gauge group), and chromoelectric charges (quarks) with nonabelian 't Hooft–Polyakov monopoles. In particular, the Higgs phase is dual to the confinement phase as in the dual superconducting model.

The mesons and baryons are preserved by the duality. However, in the electric theory the meson is a quark bilinear ($M \equiv Q^c Q$), while in the magnetic theory it is a fundamental field. In both theories the baryons are constructed from quarks, but the number of quarks in one baryon is the rank of the gauge group, which differs in the two dual theories.

The gauge symmetries of the theories do not agree, which is not problematic as the gauge symmetry is a feature of the formulation and not of the fundamental physics. The global symmetries relate distinct physical configurations, and so they need to agree in any dual description.

== Evidence ==
The moduli spaces of the dual theories are identical.

The global symmetries agree, as do the charges of the mesons and baryons.

In certain cases it reduces to ordinary electromagnetic duality.

It may be embedded in string theory via Hanany–Witten brane cartoons consisting of intersecting D-branes. There it is realized as the motion of an NS5-brane which is conjectured to preserve the universality class.

Six nontrivial anomalies may be computed on both sides of the duality, and they agree as they must in accordance with Gerard 't Hooft's anomaly matching conditions. The role of the additional fundamental meson superfield M in the dual theory is very crucial in matching the anomalies. The global gravitational anomalies also match up as the parity of the number of chiral fields is the same in both theories. The R-charge of the Weyl fermion in a chiral superfield is one less than the R-charge of the superfield. The R-charge of a gaugino is +1.

't Hooft anomaly matching conditions
anomaly	SQCD	dual theory
$SU(N_f)_L^3$	$N_c d^{(3)}(N_f)$	$N_c d^{(3)}(N_f)$
$SU(N_f)_L^2 U(1)_B$	$d^{(2)}(N_f)$	$d^{(2)}(N_f)$
$SU(N_f)_L^2 U(1)_R$	$-\frac{N_c^2}{N_f}d^{(2)}(N_f)$	$\frac{-N_c^2}{N_f}d^{(2)}(N_f)$
$U(1)_R$	$-N_c^2 -1$	$-N_c^2 -1$
$U(1)_R^3$	$-2\frac{N_c^4}{N_f^2} + N_c^2 -1$	$-2\frac{N_c^4}{N_f^2} + N_c^2 -1$
$U(1)_B^2 U(1)_R$	$-2$	$-2$

Another evidence for Seiberg duality comes from identifying the superconformal index, which is a generalization of the Witten index, for the electric and the magnetic phase. The identification gives rise to complicated integral identities which have been studied in the mathematical literature.

== Generalizations ==
Seiberg duality has been generalized in many directions. One generalization applies to quiver gauge theories, in which the flavor symmetries are also gauged. The simplest of these is a super QCD with the flavor group gauged and an additional term in the superpotential. It leads to a series of Seiberg dualities known as a duality cascade, introduced by Igor Klebanov and Matthew Strassler.

Whether Seiberg duality exists in 3-dimensional nonabelian gauge theories with only 4 supercharges is not known, although it is conjectured in some special cases with Chern–Simons terms.
