= Nathan Seiberg =

Israeli American theoretical physicist

- נתן סייברג
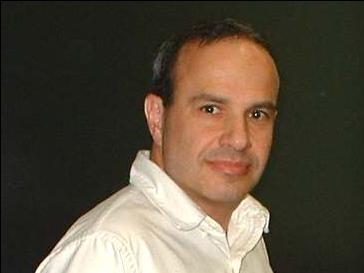
- Nathan Seiberg at Harvard University
- Born: September 22, 1956 (age 69); Tel Aviv, Israel
- Education: Tel-Aviv University, Weizmann Institute of Science
- Known for: Modular tensor category Rational conformal field theory Seiberg–Witten theory Seiberg–Witten invariants Seiberg–Witten moduli space Seiberg–Witten flow Seiberg–Witten map Seiberg duality 3D mirror symmetry
- Awards: MacArthur Fellow (1996); Heineman Prize (1998); Breakthrough Prize in Fundamental Physics (2012); Dirac Medal (2016)
- Scientific career
- Fields: Theoretical physics
- Workplaces: Weizmann Institute of Science, Rutgers University, Institute for Advanced Study
- Doctoral advisor: Haim Harari
- Doctoral students: Shiraz Minwalla

Nathan "Nati" Seiberg (/ˈsaɪbɜːrɡ/; Hebrew: נתן "נתי" זייברג; born September 22, 1956) is an Israeli American theoretical physicist who works on quantum field theory and string theory. He is currently a professor at the Institute for Advanced Study in Princeton, New Jersey, United States.

== Honors and awards ==
He was recipient of a 1996 MacArthur Fellowship and the Dannie Heineman Prize for Mathematical Physics in 1998. In July 2012, he was an inaugural awardee of the Breakthrough Prize in Fundamental Physics, the creation of physicist and internet entrepreneur, Yuri Milner. In 2016, he was awarded the Dirac Medal of the ICTP. He is a Fellow of the American Academy of Arts and Sciences and a Member of the US National Academy of Sciences.

== Research ==
His contributions include:

- Ian Affleck, Michael Dine, and Seiberg explored nonperturbative effects in supersymmetric field theories. This work demonstrated, for the first time, that nonperturbative effects in four-dimensional field theories do not respect the supersymmetry nonrenormalization theorems. This understanding led them to find four-dimensional models with dynamical supersymmetry breaking.
- In a series of papers, Michael Dine and Seiberg explored various aspects of string theory. In particular, Dine, Ryan Rohm, Seiberg, and Edward Witten proposed a supersymmetry breaking mechanism based on gluino condensation, Dine, Seiberg, and Witten showed that terms similar to Fayet–Iliopoulos D-terms arise in string theory, and Dine, Seiberg, X. G. Wen, and Witten studied instantons on the string worldsheet.
- Gregory Moore and Seiberg studied Rational Conformal Field Theories. In the course of doing it, they invented modular tensor categories and described many of their properties. They also explored the relation between Chern–Simons theory and the corresponding Rational Conformal Field Theory. This body of work was later used in mathematics and in the study of topological phases of matter.
- In the 90’s, Seiberg realized the significance of holomorphy as the underlying reason for the perturbative supersymmetry nonrenormalization theorems and initiated a program to use it to find exact results in complicated field theories including several N=1 supersymmetric gauge theories in four dimension. These theories exhibit unexpected rich phenomena like confinement with and without chiral symmetry breaking and a new kind of electric-magnetic duality – Seiberg duality. Kenneth Intriligator and Seiberg studied many more models and summarized the subject in lecture notes. Later, Intriligator, Seiberg and David Shih used this understanding of the dynamics to present four-dimensional models with dynamical supersymmetry breaking in a metastable vacuum.
- Seiberg and Witten studied the dynamics of four-dimensional N=2 supersymmetric theories – Seiberg–Witten theory. They found exact expressions for several quantities of interest. These shed new light on interesting phenomena like confinement, chiral symmetry breaking, and electric-magnetic duality. This insight was used by Witten to derive the Seiberg–Witten invariants. Later, Seiberg and Witten extended their work to the four-dimensional N=2 theory compactified to three dimensions.
- Intriligator and Seiberg found a new kind of duality in three-dimensional N=4 supersymmetric theories, which is reminiscent of the well-known 2D mirror symmetry – 3D mirror symmetry.
- In a series of papers with various collaborators, Seiberg studied many supersymmetric theories in three, four, five, and six dimensions. The three-dimensional N=2 supersymmetric theories and their dualities were shown to be related to the four-dimensional N=1 theories. And surprising five-dimensional theories with N=2 supersymmetries were discovered and analyzed.
- As part of his work on the BFSS matrix model, Seiberg discovered little string theories. These are limits of string theory without gravity that are not local quantum field theories.
- Seiberg and Witten identified a particular low-energy limit (Seiberg–Witten limit) of theories containing open strings in which the dynamics becomes that of noncommutative quantum field theory – a field theory on a non-commutative geometry. They also presented a map (Seiberg–Witten map) between standard gauge theories and gauge theories on a noncommutative space. Shiraz Minwalla, Mark Van Raamsdonk and Seiberg uncovered a surprising mixing between short-distance and long-distance phenomena in these field theories on a noncommutative space. Such mixing violates the standard picture of the renormalization group. They referred to this phenomenon as UV/IR mixing.
- Davide Gaiotto, Anton Kapustin, Seiberg, and Brian Willett introduced the notion of higher-form global symmetries and studied some of their properties and applications.

== See also ==
- Gauge theory
- Instanton
- String theory
- Two-dimensional conformal field theory
- S-duality
- Noncommutative quantum field theory
- Anomaly (physics)
