= Prepotential =

Prepotential may refer to:

- In medicine, the tendency for the action potential of cardiac cell membranes to drift towards threshold following repolarization
- In mathematics, the vector superfield in supersymmetric gauge theory
