= Seiberg–Witten map =

Special map used in gauge theory and string theory

The Seiberg–Witten map is a map used in gauge theory and string theory introduced by Nathan Seiberg and Edward Witten which relates non-commutative degrees of freedom of a gauge theory to their commutative counterparts. It was argued by Seiberg and Witten that certain non-commutative gauge theories are equivalent to commutative ones and that there exists a map from a commutative gauge field to a non-commutative one, which is compatible with the gauge structure of each.
