= Fayet–Iliopoulos D-term =

Supersymmetry term arising in abelian theories

In theoretical physics, the Fayet–Iliopoulos D-term (introduced by Pierre Fayet and John Iliopoulos) is a D-term in a supersymmetric theory obtained from a vector superfield V simply by an integral over all of superspace:

$$S_{FI} = \xi \int d^4\theta \, V$$

Because a natural trace must be a part of the expression, the action only exists for U(1) vector superfields.

In terms of the components, it is proportional simply to the last auxiliary D-term of the superfield V. It means that the corresponding D that appears in D-flatness conditions (and whose square enters the ordinary potential) is additively shifted by $\xi$, the coefficient.
