= Eugène Cremmer =

French physicist (1942–2019)

Eugène Cremmer (7 February 1942, in Paris – 30 October 2019, in Paris) was a French theoretical physicist. He was directeur de recherche at the CNRS working at the École Normale Supérieure. Cremmer was a postdoc at CERN from 1971–72. In 1978, together with Bernard Julia and Joël Scherk, he co-developed eleven-dimensional supergravity theory and proposed a mechanism of spontaneous compactification in field theory. He was also one of the first to write down the full 4D N = 1 supergravity action in 1982.
