= Topological Yang–Mills theory =

Topological field theory

In gauge theory, topological Yang–Mills theory, also known as the theta term or $\theta$-term is a gauge-invariant term which can be added to the action for four-dimensional field theories, first introduced by Edward Witten. It does not change the classical equations of motion, and its effects are only seen at the quantum level, having important consequences for CPT symmetry.

== Action ==
=== Spacetime and field content ===
The most common setting is on four-dimensional, flat spacetime (Minkowski space).

As a gauge theory, the theory has a gauge symmetry under the action of a gauge group, a Lie group $G$, with associated Lie algebra $\mathfrak{g}$ through the usual correspondence.

The field content is the gauge field $A_\mu$, also known in geometry as the connection. It is a $1$-form valued in a Lie algebra $\mathfrak{g}$.

=== Action ===
In this setting the theta term action is $S_\theta = \frac{\theta}{16\pi^2}\int d^4x \, \text{tr}(F_{\mu\nu}*F^{\mu\nu}) = \frac{\theta}{16\pi^2}\int \langle F \wedge F \rangle$ where

- $F_{\mu\nu}$ is the field strength tensor, also known in geometry as the curvature tensor. It is defined as $F_{\mu\nu} = \partial_\mu A_\nu - \partial_\nu A_\mu + [A_\mu, A_\nu]$, up to some choice of convention: the commutator sometimes appears with a scalar prefactor of $\pm i$ or $g$, a coupling constant.
- $*F^{\mu\nu}$ is the dual field strength, defined $*F^{\mu\nu} = \frac{1}{2}\epsilon^{\mu\nu\rho\sigma}F_{\rho\sigma}$.
  - $\epsilon^{\mu\nu\rho\sigma}$ is the totally antisymmetric symbol, or alternating tensor. In a more general geometric setting it is the volume form, and the dual field strength $*F$ is the Hodge dual of the field strength $F$.
- $\theta$ is the theta-angle, a real parameter.
- $\text{tr}$ is an invariant, symmetric bilinear form on $\mathfrak{g}$. It is denoted $\text{tr}$ as it is often the trace when $\mathfrak{g}$ is under some representation. Concretely, this is often the adjoint representation and in this setting $\text{tr}$ is the Killing form.

=== As a total derivative ===
The action can be written as $S_\theta = \frac{\theta}{8\pi^2} \int d^4 x \, \partial_\mu \epsilon^{\mu\nu\rho\sigma} \text{tr}\left(A_\nu \partial_\rho A_\sigma + \frac{2}{3}A_\nu A_\rho A_\sigma\right) = \frac{\theta}{8\pi^2} \int d^4 x \, \partial_\mu \epsilon^{\mu\nu\rho\sigma} \text{CS}(A)_{\nu\rho\sigma},$ where $\text{CS}(A)$ is the Chern–Simons 3-form.

Classically, this means the theta term does not contribute to the classical equations of motion.

== See also ==
- Yang–Mills theory
