= Supersymmetry nonrenormalization theorems =

In theoretical physics a nonrenormalization theorem is a limitation on how a certain quantity in the classical description of a quantum field theory may be modified by renormalization in the full quantum theory. Renormalization theorems are common in theories with a sufficient amount of supersymmetry, usually at least 4 supercharges.

Perhaps the first nonrenormalization theorem was introduced by Marcus T. Grisaru, Martin Rocek and Warren Siegel in their 1979 paper Improved methods for supergraphs.

== Nonrenormalization in supersymmetric theories and holomorphy ==
Nonrenormalization theorems in supersymmetric theories are often consequences of the fact that certain objects must have a holomorphic dependence on the quantum fields and coupling constants. In this case the nonrenormalization theory is said to be a consequence of holomorphy.

The more supersymmetry a theory has, the more renormalization theorems apply. Therefore, a renormalization theorem that is valid for a theory with $\mathcal{N}$ supersymmetries will also apply to any theory with more than $\mathcal{N}$ supersymmetries.

=== Examples in 4-dimensional theories ===
In 4 dimensions the number $\mathcal{N}$ counts the number of 4-component Majorana spinors of supercharges. Some examples of nonrenormalization theorems in 4-dimensional supersymmetric theories are:

In an $\mathcal{N}=1$ 4D SUSY theory involving only chiral superfields, the superpotential is immune from renormalization. With an arbitrary field content it is immune from renormalization in perturbation theory but may be renormalized by nonperturbative effects such as instantons.

In an $\mathcal{N}=2$ 4D SUSY theory the moduli space of the hypermultiplets, called the Higgs branch, has a hyper-Kähler metric and is not renormalized. In the article Lagrangians of N=2 Supergravity - Matter Systems it was further shown that this metric is independent of the scalars in the vector multiplets. They also proved that the metric of the Coulomb branch, which is a rigid special Kähler manifold parametrized by the scalars in $\mathcal{N}=2$ vector multiplets, is independent of the scalars in the hypermultiplets. Therefore, the vacuum manifold is locally a product of a Coulomb and Higgs branch. The derivations of these statements appear in The Moduli Space of N=2 SUSY QCD and Duality in N=1 SUSY QCD.

In an $\mathcal{N}=2$ 4D SUSY theory the superpotential is entirely determined by the matter content of the theory. Also there are no perturbative corrections to the β-function beyond one-loop, as was shown in 1983 in the article Superspace Or One Thousand and One Lessons in Supersymmetry by Sylvester James Gates, Marcus Grisaru, Martin Rocek and Warren Siegel.

In $\mathcal{N}=4$ super Yang–Mills the β-function is zero for all couplings, meaning that the theory is conformal. This was demonstrated perturbatively by Martin Sohnius and Peter West in the 1981 article Conformal Invariance in N=4 Supersymmetric Yang-Mills Theory under certain symmetry assumptions on the theory, and then with no assumptions by Stanley Mandelstam in the 1983 article Light Cone Superspace and the Ultraviolet Finiteness of the N=4 Model. The full nonperturbative proof by Nathan Seiberg appeared in the 1988 article Supersymmetry and Nonperturbative beta Functions.

=== Examples in 3-dimensional theories ===
In 3 dimensions the number $\mathcal{N}$ counts the number of 2-component Majorana spinors of supercharges.

When $\mathcal{N}=1$ there is no holomorphicity and few exact results are known.

When $\mathcal{N}=2$ the superpotential cannot depend on the linear multiplets and in particular is independent of the Fayet–Iliopoulos terms (FI) and Majorana mass terms. On the other hand, the central charge is independent of the chiral multiplets, and so is a linear combination of the FI and Majorana mass terms. These two theorems were stated and proven in Aspects of N=2 Supersymmetric Gauge Theories in Three Dimensions.

When $\mathcal{N}=3$, unlike $\mathcal{N}=2$, the R-symmetry is the nonabelian group SU(2) and so the representation of each field is not renormalized. In a super conformal field theory the conformal dimension of a chiral multiplet is entirely determined by its R-charge, and so these conformal dimensions are not renormalized. Therefore, matter fields have no wave function renormalization in $\mathcal{N}=3$ superconformal field theories, as was shown in On Mirror Symmetry in Three Dimensional Abelian Gauge Theories. These theories consist of vector multiplets and hypermultiplets. The hypermultiplet metric is hyperkähler and may not be lifted by quantum corrections, but its metric may be modified. No renormalizable interaction between hyper and abelian vector multiplets is possible except for Chern–Simons terms.

When $\mathcal{N}=4$, unlike $\mathcal{N}=3$ the hypermultiplet metric may no longer be modified by quantum corrections.

=== Examples in 2-dimensional theories ===
In $\mathcal{N}=(2,2)$ linear sigma models, which are superrenormalizable abelian gauge theories with matter in chiral supermultiplets, Edward Witten has argued in Phases of N=2 theories in two-dimensions that the only divergent quantum correction is the logarithmic one-loop correction to the FI term.

== Nonrenormalization from a quantization condition ==
In supersymmetric and nonsupersymmetric theories, the nonrenormalization of a quantity subject to the Dirac quantization condition is often a consequence of the fact that possible renormalizations would be inconsistent with the quantization condition, for example the quantization of the level of a Chern–Simons theory implies that it may only be renormalized at one-loop. In the 1994 article Nonrenormalization Theorem for Gauge Coupling in 2+1D the authors find the renormalization of the level can only be a finite shift, independent of the energy scale, and extended this result to topologically massive theories in which one includes a kinetic term for the gluons. In Notes on Superconformal Chern-Simons-Matter Theories the authors then showed that this shift needs to occur at one loop, because any renormalization at higher loops would introduce inverse powers of the level, which are nonintegral and so would be in conflict with the quantization condition.
