= Wess–Zumino gauge =

Type of gauge fixing used in supersymmetry

In particle physics, the Wess–Zumino gauge is a particular choice of a gauge transformation in a gauge theory with supersymmetry. In this gauge, the supersymmetrized gauge transformation is chosen in such a way that most components of the vector superfield vanish, except for the usual physical ones when the function of the superspace is expanded in terms of components.

== See also ==
- Supersymmetric gauge theory
