= D-term =

Term in supersymmetric theories

In theoretical physics, the D-term is the final term in the expansion of a vector superfield over fermionic coordinates. A superfield is a field that depends on all coordinates of the superspace, which is the coordinate space of a theory exhibiting supersymmetry.

A superspace can be expressed as a combination of ordinary space dimensions (x, y, z, ...,) and fermionic dimensions. 4D N = 1 global supersymmetry may be written using a superspace involving four extra fermionic coordinates $\theta^1,\theta^2,\bar\theta^1,\bar\theta^2$, transforming as a two-component spinor and its conjugate. Every superfield may be expanded with respect to the new fermionic coordinates. The generic kind of superfields, typically a vector superfield, indeed depend on all these coordinates. The last term in the corresponding expansion, namely $D \theta^1\theta^2\bar\theta^1\bar\theta^2$, is called the D-term.

Manifestly supersymmetric Lagrangians may also be written as integrals over the whole superspace. A D-term obtained from a vector superfield solely by an integral over all of superspace is known as a Fayet–Iliopoulos D-term. Some special terms, such as the superpotential, may be written as integrals over $\theta$s only, which are known as F-terms, and should be contrasted with the present D-terms.

== See also ==
- F-term
- Supersymmetric gauge theory
