= F-term =

Term found in supersymmetric theories

In theoretical physics, one often analyzes theories with supersymmetry in which F-terms play an important role. In four dimensions, the minimal N=1 supersymmetry may be written using a superspace. This superspace involves four extra fermionic coordinates $\theta^1,\theta^2,\bar\theta^1,\bar\theta^2$, transforming as a two-component spinor and its conjugate.

Every superfield—i.e. a field that depends on all coordinates of the superspace—may be expanded with respect to the new fermionic coordinates. There exists a special kind of superfields, the so-called chiral superfields, that only depend on the variables $\theta$ but not their conjugates. The last term in the corresponding expansion, namely $F \theta^1\theta^2$, is called the F-term. Applying an infinitesimal supersymmetry transformation to a chiral superfield results in yet another chiral superfield whose F-term, in particular, changes by a total derivative. This is significant because then $\int{d^4x\, F(x)}$ is invariant under SUSY transformations as long as boundary terms vanish. Thus F-terms may be used in constructing supersymmetric actions.

Manifestly-supersymmetric Lagrangians may also be written as integrals over the whole superspace. Some special terms, such as the superpotential, may be written as integrals over $\theta$s only. They are also referred to as F-terms, much like the terms in the ordinary potential that arise from these terms of the supersymmetric Lagrangian.

== See also ==
- D-term
- Supersymmetric gauge theory
