= Multiplet =

State space for internal degrees of freedom of a subatomic particle

In physics and particularly in particle physics, a multiplet is the state space for 'internal' degrees of freedom of a particle; that is, degrees of freedom associated to a particle itself, as opposed to 'external' degrees of freedom such as the particle's position in space. Examples of such degrees of freedom are the spin state of a particle in quantum mechanics, or the color, isospin and hypercharge state of particles in the Standard Model of particle physics. Formally, we describe this state space by a vector space which carries the action of a group of continuous symmetries.

== Mathematical formulation ==
Mathematically, multiplets are described via representations of a Lie group or its corresponding Lie algebra, and is usually used to refer to irreducible representations (irreps, for short).

At the group level, this is a triplet $(V,G,\rho)$ where

- $V$ is a vector space over a field (in the algebra sense) $K$, generally taken to be $K = \mathbb{R}$ or $\mathbb{C}$
- $G$ is a Lie group. This is often a compact Lie group.
- $\rho$ is a group homomorphism $G\rightarrow \text{GL}(V)$, that is, a map from the group $G$ to the space of invertible linear maps on $V$. This map must preserve the group structure: for $g_1,g_2\in G,$ we have $\rho(g_1\cdot g_2) = \rho(g_1)\rho(g_2)$.

At the algebra level, this is a triplet $(V,\mathfrak{g},\rho)$, where

- $V$ is as before.
- $\mathfrak{g}$ is a Lie algebra. It is often a finite-dimensional Lie algebra over $\mathbb{R}$ or $\mathbb{C}$.
- $\rho$ is an Lie algebra homomorphism $\mathfrak{g}\rightarrow\text{End}(V)$. This is a linear map which preserves the Lie bracket: for $X_1, X_2 \in \mathfrak{g},$ we have $\rho([X_1, X_2])=[\rho(X_1),\rho(X_2)]$.

The symbol $\rho$ is used for both Lie algebras and Lie groups as, at least in finite dimension, there is a well understood correspondence between Lie groups and Lie algebras.

In mathematics, it is common to refer to the homomorphism $\rho$ as the representation, for example in the sentence 'consider a representation $\rho$', and the vector space $V$ is referred to as the 'representation space'. In physics sometimes the vector space is referred to as the representation, for example in the sentence 'we model the particle as transforming in the singlet representation', or even to refer to a quantum field which takes values in such a representation, and the physical particles which are modelled by such a quantum field.

For an irreducible representation, an $n$-plet refers to an $n$ dimensional irreducible representation. Generally, a group may have multiple non-isomorphic representations of the same dimension, so this does not fully characterize the representation. An exception is $\text{SU}(2)$ which has exactly one irreducible representation of dimension $n$ for each non-negative integer $n$.

For example, consider real three-dimensional space, $\mathbb{R}^3$. The group of 3D rotations SO(3) acts naturally on this space as a group of $3\times 3$ matrices. This explicit realisation of the rotation group is known as the fundamental representation $\rho_{\text{fund}}$, so $\mathbb{R}^3$ is a representation space. The full data of the representation is $(\mathbb{R}^3,\text{SO(3)},\rho_{\text{fund}})$. Since the dimension of this representation space is 3, this is known as the triplet representation for $\text{SO}(3)$, and it is common to denote this as $\mathbf{3}$.

=== Application to theoretical physics ===
For applications to theoretical physics, we can restrict our attention to the representation theory of a handful of physically important groups. Many of these have well understood representation theory:

- $\text{U}(1)$: Part of the gauge group of the Standard model, and the gauge group for theories of electromagnetism. Irreps are all 1 dimensional and are indexed by integers $\mathbb{Z}$, given explicitly by $\rho_n:\text{U}(1)\rightarrow\text{GL}(\mathbb{C}); e^{i\theta}\mapsto e^{in\theta}$. The index can be understood as the winding number of the map.
- $\text{SU}(2)\cong\text{Spin}(3)$: Part of the gauge group of the Standard model. Irreps are indexed by non-negative integers in $n\in\mathbb{N}_{\geq 0}$, with $n$ describing the dimension of the representation, or, with appropriate normalisation, the highest weight of the representation. In physics it is common convention to label these by half-integers instead. See Representation theory of SU(2).
- $\text{SO}(3)$: The group of rotations of 3D space. Irreps are the odd-dimensional irreps of $\text{SU}(2)$
- $\text{SU}(3)$: Part of the gauge group of the Standard model. Irreps are indexed pairs of non-negative integers $(m,n)$, describing the highest weight of the representation. See Clebsch-Gordan coefficients for SU(3).
- $\text{SO}(1,3)$: The Lorentz group, the linear symmetries of flat spacetime. All representations arise as representations of its corresponding spin group. See Representation theory of the Lorentz group.
- $\text{SL}(2,\mathbb{C})\cong \text{Spin}(1,3)$: The spin group of $\text{SO}(1,3)$. Irreps are indexed by pairs of non-negative integers $(\mu,\nu)$, indexing the dimension of the representation.
- $\text{E}(1,3)\cong \mathbb{R}^{1,3}\rtimes\text{SO}(1,3)$: The Poincaré group of isometries of flat spacetime. This can be understood in terms of the representation theory of the groups above. See Wigner's classification.

These groups all appear in the theory of the Standard model. For theories which extend these symmetries, the representation theory of some other groups might be considered:

- Conformal symmetry: For pseudo-Euclidean space, symmetries are described by the conformal group $\text{Conf}(p,q)\cong O(p,q)/\mathbb{Z}_2$.
- Supersymmetry: Symmetry described by a supergroup.
- Grand unified theories: Gauge groups which contain the Standard model gauge group as a subgroup. Proposed candidates include $\text{SU}(5), \text{SO}(10)$ and $\text{E}_6$.

== Physics ==
=== Quantum field theory ===
In quantum physics, the mathematical notion is usually applied to representations of the gauge group. For example, an $\text{SU}(2)$ gauge theory will have multiplets which are fields whose representation of $\text{SU}(2)$ is determined by the single half-integer number $s=:n/2$, the isospin. Since irreducible $\text{SU}(2)$ representations are isomorphic to the $n$th symmetric power of the fundamental representation, every field has $n$ symmetrized internal indices.

Fields also transform under representations of the Lorentz group $\text{SO}(1,3)$, or more generally its spin group $\text{Spin}(1,3)$ which can be identified with $\text{SL}(2,\mathbb{C})$ due to an exceptional isomorphism. Examples include scalar fields, commonly denoted $\phi$, which transform in the trivial representation, vector fields $A_\mu$ (strictly, this might be more accurately labelled a covector field), which transforms as a 4-vector, and spinor fields $\psi_\alpha$ such as Dirac or Weyl spinors which transform in representations of $\text{SL}(2,\mathbb{C})$. A right-handed Weyl spinor transforms in the fundamental representation, $\mathbb{C}^2$, of $\text{SL}(2,\mathbb{C})$.

Beware that besides the Lorentz group, a field can transform under the action of a gauge group. For example, a scalar field $\phi(x)$, where $x$ is a spacetime point, might have an isospin state taking values in the fundamental representation $\mathbb{C}^2$ of $\text{SU}(2)$. Then $\phi(x)$ is a vector valued function of spacetime, but is still referred to as a scalar field, as it transforms trivially under Lorentz transformations.

In quantum field theory different particles correspond one to one with gauged fields transforming in irreducible representations of the internal and Lorentz group. Thus, a multiplet has also come to describe a collection of subatomic particles described by these representations.

==== Examples ====
The best known example is a spin multiplet, which describes symmetries of a group representation of an SU(2) subgroup of the Lorentz algebra, which is used to define spin quantization. A spin singlet is a trivial representation, a spin doublet is a fundamental representation and a spin triplet is in the vector representation or adjoint representation.

In QCD, quarks are in a multiplet of SU(3), specifically the three-dimensional fundamental representation.

== Other uses ==
=== Spectroscopy ===
In spectroscopy, particularly Gamma spectroscopy and X-ray spectroscopy, a multiplet is a group of related or unresolvable spectral lines. Where the number of unresolved lines is small, these are often referred to specifically as doublet or triplet peaks, while multiplet is used to describe groups of peaks in any number.

== See also ==
- Hypercharge
- Isospin
- Spin (physics)
- Group representation
- Multiplicity (chemistry)
