= Supersymmetric gauge theory =

Gauge theory with supersymmetry

In theoretical physics, there are many theories with supersymmetry (SUSY) which also have internal gauge symmetries. Supersymmetric gauge theory generalizes this notion.

== Gauge theory ==
A gauge theory is a field theory with gauge symmetry. Roughly, there are two types of symmetries, global and local. A global symmetry is a symmetry applied uniformly (in some sense) to each point of a manifold. A local symmetry is a symmetry which is position dependent. Gauge symmetry is an example of a local symmetry, with the symmetry described by a Lie group (which mathematically describe continuous symmetries), which in the context of gauge theory is called the gauge group of the theory.

Quantum chromodynamics and quantum electrodynamics are famous examples of gauge theories.

== Supersymmetry ==
In particle physics, there exist particles with two kinds of particle statistics, bosons and fermions. Bosons carry integer spin values, and are characterized by the ability to have any number of identical bosons occupy a single point in space. They are thus identified with forces. Fermions carry half-integer spin values, and by the Pauli exclusion principle, identical fermions cannot occupy a single position in spacetime. Boson and fermion fields are interpreted as matter. Thus, supersymmetry is considered a strong candidate for the unification of radiation (boson-mediated forces) and matter.

This unification is given by an operator $Q$ (or typically many operators), known as a supercharge or supersymmetry generator, which acts schematically as

$Q|\text{boson}\rangle = |\text{fermion}\rangle$
$Q|\text{fermion}\rangle = |\text{boson}\rangle$

For instance, the supersymmetry generator can take a photon as an argument and transform it into a photino and vice versa. This happens through translation in the (parameter) space. This superspace is a ${\mathbb{Z}_2}$-graded vector space $\mathcal{W}=\mathcal{W}^0 \oplus \mathcal{W}^1$, where $\mathcal{W}^0$ is the bosonic Hilbert space and $\mathcal{W}^1$ is the fermionic Hilbert space.

== SUSY gauge theory ==
The motivation for a supersymmetric version of gauge theory can be the fact that gauge invariance is consistent with supersymmetry. The first examples were discovered by Bruno Zumino and Sergio Ferrara, and independently by Abdus Salam and James Strathdee in 1974.

Both the half-integer spin fermions and the integer spin bosons can become gauge particles. The gauge vector fields and its spinorial superpartner can be made to both reside in the same representation of the internal symmetry group.

Suppose we have a $U(1)$ gauge transformation $V_{\mu} \rightarrow V_{\mu} + \partial_{\mu} A$, where $V_{\mu}$ is a vector field and $A$ is the gauge function. The main difficulty in construction of a SUSY Gauge Theory is to extend the above transformation in a way that is consistent with SUSY transformations.

The Wess–Zumino gauge (a prescription for supersymmetric gauge fixing) provides a successful solution to this problem. Once such suitable gauge is obtained, the dynamics of the SUSY gauge theory work as follows: we seek a Lagrangian that is invariant under the Super-gauge transformations (these transformations are an important tool needed to develop supersymmetric version of a gauge theory). Then we can integrate the Lagrangian using the Berezin integration rules and thus obtain the action. Which further leads to the equations of motion and hence can provide a complete analysis of the dynamics of the theory.

== N = 1 SUSY in 4D (with 4 real generators) ==
In four dimensions, the minimal N = 1 supersymmetry may be written using a superspace. This superspace involves four extra fermionic coordinates $\theta^1,\theta^2,\bar\theta^1,\bar\theta^2$, transforming as a two-component spinor and its conjugate.

Every superfield, i.e. a field that depends on all coordinates of the superspace, may be expanded with respect to the new fermionic coordinates. There exists a special kind of superfields, the so-called chiral superfields, that only depend on the variables θ but not their conjugates (more precisely, $\overline{D}f=0$). However, a vector superfield depends on all coordinates. It describes a gauge field and its superpartner, namely a Weyl fermion that obeys a Dirac equation.

$$V = C + i\theta\chi - i \overline{\theta}\overline{\chi} + \tfrac{i}{2}\theta^2(M+iN)-\tfrac{i}{2}\overline{\theta^2}(M-iN) - \theta \sigma^\mu \overline{\theta} v_\mu +i\theta^2 \overline{\theta} \left( \overline{\lambda} - \tfrac{i}{2}\overline{\sigma}^\mu \partial_\mu \chi \right) -i\overline{\theta}^2 \theta \left(\lambda + \tfrac{i}{2}\sigma^\mu \partial_\mu \overline{\chi} \right) + \tfrac{1}{2}\theta^2 \overline{\theta}^2 \left(D + \tfrac{1}{2}\Box C\right)$$

V is the vector superfield (prepotential) and is real (V̅ = V). The fields on the right hand side are component fields.

The gauge transformations act as

$$V \to V + \Lambda + \overline{\Lambda}$$

where Λ is any chiral superfield.

It's easy to check that the chiral superfield

$$W_\alpha \equiv -\tfrac{1}{4}\overline{D}^2 D_\alpha V$$

is gauge invariant. So is its complex conjugate $\overline{W}_{\dot{\alpha}}$.

A non-supersymmetric covariant gauge which is often used is the Wess–Zumino gauge. Here, C, χ, M and N are all set to zero. The residual gauge symmetries are gauge transformations of the traditional bosonic type.

A chiral superfield X with a charge of q transforms as

$$X \to e^{q\Lambda}X, \qquad \overline{X} \to e^{q\overline{\Lambda}}X$$

Therefore X̅e^{−qV}X is gauge invariant. Here e^{−qV} is called a bridge since it "bridges" a field which transforms under Λ only with a field which transforms under Λ̅ only.

More generally, if we have a real gauge group G that we wish to supersymmetrize, we first have to complexify it to G^{c} ⋅ e^{−qV} then acts a compensator for the complex gauge transformations in effect absorbing them leaving only the real parts. This is what's being done in the Wess–Zumino gauge.

=== Differential superforms ===
Let's rephrase everything to look more like a conventional Yang–Mills gauge theory. We have a U(1) gauge symmetry acting upon full superspace with a 1-superform gauge connection A. In the analytic basis for the tangent space, the covariant derivative is given by $D_M=d_M+iqA_M$. Integrability conditions for chiral superfields with the chiral constraint

$$\overline{D}_{\dot{\alpha}}X=0$$

leave us with

$$\left\{\overline{D}_{\dot{\alpha}}, \overline{D}_{\dot{\beta}} \right\}=F_{\dot{\alpha}\dot{\beta}}=0.$$

A similar constraint for antichiral superfields leaves us with F_{αβ} = 0. This means that we can either gauge fix $A_{\dot{\alpha}}=0$ or A_{α} = 0 but not both simultaneously. Call the two different gauge fixing schemes I and II respectively. In gauge I, $\overline{d}_{\dot{\alpha}}X=0$ and in gauge II, d_{α} X̅ = 0. Now, the trick is to use two different gauges simultaneously; gauge I for chiral superfields and gauge II for antichiral superfields. In order to bridge between the two different gauges, we need a gauge transformation. Call it e^{−V} (by convention). If we were using one gauge for all fields, X̅X would be gauge invariant. However, we need to convert gauge I to gauge II, transforming X to (e^{−V})^{q}X. So, the gauge invariant quantity is X̅e^{−qV}X.

In gauge I, we still have the residual gauge e^{Λ} where $\overline{d}_{\dot{\alpha}}\Lambda=0$ and in gauge II, we have the residual gauge e^{Λ̅} satisfying d_{α} Λ̅ = 0. Under the residual gauges, the bridge transforms as

$$e^{-V}\to e^{-\overline{\Lambda}-V-\Lambda}.$$

Without any additional constraints, the bridge e^{−V} wouldn't give all the information about the gauge field. However, with the additional constraint $F_{\dot{\alpha}\beta}$, there's only one unique gauge field which is compatible with the bridge modulo gauge transformations. Now, the bridge gives exactly the same information content as the gauge field.

== Theories with 8 or more SUSY generators (N > 1) ==
In theories with higher supersymmetry (and perhaps higher dimension), a vector superfield typically describes not only a gauge field and a Weyl fermion but also at least one complex scalar field.

== Examples ==
=== Pure supersymmetric gauge theories ===
- N = 1 Super Yang–Mills
- N = 2 Super Yang–Mills
- N = 4 Super Yang–Mills

=== Supersymmetric gauge theories with matter ===
- Super QCD
- MSSM (Minimal supersymmetric Standard Model)
- NMSSM (Next-to-minimal supersymmetric Standard Model)

== See also ==
- superpotential
- D-term
- F-term
- Supermultiplet
- Supersymmetric quantum mechanics
