= Superpotential =

In theoretical physics, the superpotential is a function in supersymmetric quantum mechanics. Given a superpotential, two "partner potentials" are derived that can each serve as a potential in the Schrödinger equation. The partner potentials have the same spectrum, apart from a possible eigenvalue of zero, meaning that the physical systems represented by the two potentials have the same characteristic energies, apart from a possible zero-energy ground state.

== One-dimensional example ==
Consider a one-dimensional, non-relativistic particle with a two state internal degree of freedom called "spin". (This is not quite the usual notion of spin encountered in nonrelativistic quantum mechanics, because "real" spin applies only to particles in three-dimensional space.) Let b and its Hermitian adjoint b^{†} signify operators which transform a "spin up" particle into a "spin down" particle and vice versa, respectively. Furthermore, take b and b^{†} to be normalized such that the anticommutator {b,b^{†}} equals 1, and take that b^{2} equals 0. Let p represent the momentum of the particle and x represent its position with [x,p]=i, where we use natural units so that $\hbar=1$. Let W (the superpotential) represent an arbitrary differentiable function of x and define the supersymmetric operators Q_{1} and Q_{2} as

$$Q_1=\frac{1}{2}\left[(p-iW)b+(p+iW)b^\dagger\right]$$
$$Q_2=\frac{i}{2}\left[(p-iW)b-(p+iW)b^\dagger\right]$$

The operators Q_{1} and Q_{2} are self-adjoint. Let the Hamiltonian be

$$H=\{Q_1,Q_1\}=\{Q_2,Q_2\}=\frac{p^2}{2}+\frac{W^2}{2}+\frac{W'}{2}(bb^\dagger-b^\dagger b)$$

where W' signifies the derivative of W. Also note that {Q_{1},Q_{2}}=0. Under these circumstances, the above system is a toy model of N=2 supersymmetry. The spin down and spin up states are often referred to as the "bosonic" and "fermionic" states, respectively, in an analogy to quantum field theory. With these definitions, Q_{1} and Q_{2} map "bosonic" states into "fermionic" states and vice versa. Restricting to the bosonic or fermionic sectors gives two partner potentials determined by

$$H = \frac{p^2}{2}+\frac{W^2}{2} \pm \frac{W'}{2}$$

== In four spacetime dimensions ==
In supersymmetric quantum field theories with four spacetime dimensions, which might have some connection to nature, it turns out that scalar fields arise as the lowest component of a chiral superfield, which tends to automatically be complex valued. We may identify the complex conjugate of a chiral superfield as an anti-chiral superfield. There are two possible ways to obtain an action from a set of superfields:

- Integrate a superfield on the whole superspace spanned by $x_{0,1,2,3}$ and $\theta,\bar\theta$,

or

- Integrate a chiral superfield on the chiral half of a superspace, spanned by $x_{0,1,2,3}$ and $\theta$, not on $\bar\theta$.

The second option tells us that an arbitrary holomorphic function of a set of chiral superfields can show up as a term in a Lagrangian which is invariant under supersymmetry. In this context, holomorphic means that the function can only depend on the chiral superfields, not their complex conjugates. We may call such a function W, the superpotential. The fact that W is holomorphic in the chiral superfields helps explain why supersymmetric theories are relatively tractable, as it allows one to use powerful mathematical tools from complex analysis. Indeed, it is known that W receives no perturbative corrections, a result referred to as the perturbative non-renormalization theorem. Note that non-perturbative processes may correct this, for example through contributions to the beta functions due to instantons.

== See also ==
- Komar superpotential
