= Supermultiplet =

Representation of the supersymmetry algebra

In theoretical physics, a supermultiplet is a representation of a supersymmetry algebra, possibly with extended supersymmetry.

Then a superfield is a field on superspace which is valued in such a representation. Naïvely, or when considering flat superspace, a superfield can simply be viewed as a function on superspace. Formally, it is a section of an associated supermultiplet bundle.

Phenomenologically, superfields are used to describe particles. It is a feature of supersymmetric field theories that particles form pairs, called superpartners where bosons are paired with fermions.

These supersymmetric fields are used to build supersymmetric quantum field theories, where the fields are promoted to operators.

== History ==
Superfields were introduced by Abdus Salam and J. A. Strathdee in a 1974 article. Operations on superfields and a partial classification were presented a few months later by Sergio Ferrara, Julius Wess and Bruno Zumino.

== Naming and classification ==
The most commonly used supermultiplets are vector multiplets, chiral multiplets (in $d = 4,\mathcal{N} = 1$ supersymmetry for example), hypermultiplets (in $d = 4,\mathcal{N} = 2$ supersymmetry for example), tensor multiplets and gravity multiplets. The highest component of a vector multiplet is a gauge boson, the highest component of a chiral or hypermultiplet is a spinor, the highest component of a gravity multiplet is a graviton. The names are defined so as to be invariant under dimensional reduction, although the organization of the fields as representations of the Lorentz group changes.

The use of these names for the different multiplets can vary in literature. A chiral multiplet (whose highest component is a spinor) may sometimes be referred to as a scalar multiplet, and in $d = 4,\mathcal{N} = 2$ SUSY, a vector multiplet (whose highest component is a vector) can sometimes be referred to as a chiral multiplet.

== Superfields in d = 4, N = 1 supersymmetry ==
Conventions in this section follow the notes by Figueroa-O'Farrill (2001).

A general complex superfield $\Phi(x, \theta, \bar \theta)$ in $d = 4, \mathcal{N} = 1$ supersymmetry can be expanded as

$$\Phi(x, \theta, \bar\theta) = \phi(x) + \theta\chi(x) + \bar\theta \bar\chi'(x) + \bar \theta \sigma^\mu \theta V_\mu(x) + \theta^2 F(x) + \bar \theta^2 \bar F'(x) + \bar\theta^2 \theta\xi(x) + \theta^2 \bar\theta \bar \xi' (x) + \theta^2 \bar\theta^2 D(x)$$,

where $\phi, \chi, \bar \chi' , V_\mu, F, \bar F', \xi, \bar \xi', D$ are different complex fields. This is not an irreducible supermultiplet, and so different constraints are needed to isolate irreducible representations.

=== Chiral superfield ===
A (anti-)chiral superfield is a supermultiplet of $d=4, \mathcal{N} = 1$ supersymmetry.

In four dimensions, the minimal $\mathcal{N}=1$ supersymmetry may be written using the notion of superspace. Superspace contains the usual space-time coordinates $x^{\mu}$, $\mu=0,\ldots,3$, and four extra fermionic coordinates $\theta_\alpha,\bar\theta^\dot\alpha$ with $\alpha, \dot\alpha = 1,2$, transforming as a two-component (Weyl) spinor and its conjugate.

In $d = 4,\mathcal{N} = 1$ supersymmetry, a chiral superfield is a function over chiral superspace. There exists a projection from the (full) superspace to chiral superspace. So, a function over chiral superspace can be pulled back to the full superspace. Such a function $\Phi(x, \theta, \bar\theta)$ satisfies the covariant constraint $\overline{D}\Phi=0$, where $\bar D$ is the covariant derivative, given in index notation as

$$\bar D_\dot\alpha = -\bar\partial_\dot\alpha - i\theta^\alpha \sigma^\mu_{\alpha\dot\alpha}\partial_\mu.$$

A chiral superfield $\Phi(x, \theta, \bar\theta)$ can then be expanded as

$$\Phi (y , \theta ) = \phi(y) + \sqrt{2} \theta \psi (y) + \theta^2 F(y),$$

where $y^\mu = x^\mu + i \theta \sigma^\mu \bar{\theta}$. The superfield is independent of the 'conjugate spin coordinates' $\bar\theta$ in the sense that it depends on $\bar\theta$ only through $y^\mu$. It can be checked that $\bar D_\dot\alpha y^\mu = 0.$

The expansion has the interpretation that $\phi$ is a complex scalar field, $\psi$ is a Weyl spinor. There is also the auxiliary complex scalar field $F$, named $F$ by convention: this is the F-term which plays an important role in some theories.

The field can then be expressed in terms of the original coordinates $(x,\theta, \bar \theta)$ by substituting the expression for $y$:

$$\Phi(x, \theta, \bar\theta) = \phi(x) + \sqrt{2} \theta \psi (x) + \theta^2 F(x) + i\theta\sigma^\mu\bar\theta\partial_\mu\phi(x) - \frac{i}{\sqrt{2}}\theta^2\partial_\mu\psi(x)\sigma^\mu\bar\theta - \frac{1}{4}\theta^2\bar\theta^2\square\phi(x).$$

==== Antichiral superfields ====
Similarly, there is also antichiral superspace, which is the complex conjugate of chiral superspace, and antichiral superfields.

An antichiral superfield $\Phi^\dagger$ satisfies $D \Phi^\dagger = 0,$ where

$$D_\alpha = \partial_\alpha + i\sigma^\mu_{\alpha\dot\alpha}\bar\theta^\dot\alpha\partial_\mu.$$

An antichiral superfield can be constructed as the complex conjugate of a chiral superfield.

==== Actions from chiral superfields ====
For an action which can be defined from a single chiral superfield, see Wess–Zumino model.

=== Vector superfield ===
The vector superfield is a supermultiplet of $\mathcal{N} = 1$ supersymmetry.

A vector superfield (also known as a real superfield) is a function $V(x,\theta,\bar\theta)$ which satisfies the reality condition $V = V^\dagger$. Such a field admits the expansion

$$V = C + i\theta\chi - i \overline{\theta}\overline{\chi} + \tfrac{i}{2}\theta^2(M+iN)-\tfrac{i}{2}\overline{\theta^2}(M-iN) - \theta \sigma^\mu \overline{\theta} A_\mu +i\theta^2 \overline{\theta} \left( \overline{\lambda} + \tfrac{i}{2}\overline{\sigma}^\mu \partial_\mu \chi \right) -i\overline{\theta}^2 \theta \left(\lambda + \tfrac{i}{2}\sigma^\mu \partial_\mu \overline{\chi} \right) + \tfrac{1}{2}\theta^2 \overline{\theta}^2 \left(D + \tfrac{1}{2}\Box C\right).$$

The constituent fields are

- Two real scalar fields $C$ and $D$
- A complex scalar field $M + iN$
- Two Weyl spinor fields $\chi_\alpha$ and $\lambda^\alpha$
- A real vector field (gauge field) $A_\mu$

Their transformation properties and uses are further discussed in supersymmetric gauge theory.

Using gauge transformations, the fields $C, \chi$ and $M + iN$ can be set to zero. This is known as Wess–Zumino gauge. In this gauge, the expansion takes on the much simpler form

$$V_{\text{WZ}} = \theta\sigma^\mu\bar\theta A_\mu + \theta^2 \bar\theta \bar\lambda + \bar\theta^2 \theta \lambda + \frac{1}{2}\theta^2\bar\theta^2 D.$$

Then $\lambda$ is the superpartner of $A_\mu$, while $D$ is an auxiliary scalar field. It is conventionally called $D$, and is known as the D-term.

== Scalars ==
A scalar is never the highest component of a superfield; whether it appears in a superfield at all depends on the dimension of the spacetime. For example, in a 10-dimensional N=1 theory the vector multiplet contains only a vector and a Majorana–Weyl spinor, while its dimensional reduction on a d-dimensional torus is a vector multiplet containing d real scalars. Similarly, in an 11-dimensional theory there is only one supermultiplet with a finite number of fields, the gravity multiplet, and it contains no scalars. However again its dimensional reduction on a d-torus to a maximal gravity multiplet does contain scalars.

== Hypermultiplet ==
A hypermultiplet is a type of representation of an extended supersymmetry algebra, in particular the matter multiplet of $\mathcal{N} = 2$ supersymmetry in 4 dimensions, containing two complex scalars A_{i}, a Dirac spinor ψ, and two further auxiliary complex scalars F_{i}.

The name "hypermultiplet" comes from old term "hypersymmetry" for N=2 supersymmetry used by Fayet (1976); this term has been abandoned, but the name "hypermultiplet" for some of its representations is still used.

== Extended supersymmetry (N > 1) ==
This section records some commonly used irreducible supermultiplets in extended supersymmetry in the $d = 4$ case. These are constructed by a highest-weight representation construction in the sense that there is a vacuum vector annihilated by the supercharges $Q^A, A = 1, \cdots, \mathcal{N}$. The irreps have dimension $2^\mathcal{N}$. For supermultiplets representing massless particles, on physical grounds the maximum allowed $\mathcal{N}$ is $\mathcal{N} = 8$, while for renormalizability, the maximum allowed $\mathcal{N}$ is $\mathcal{N} = 4$.

=== N = 2 ===
The $\mathcal{N} = 2$ vector or chiral multiplet $\Psi$ contains a gauge field $A_\mu$, two Weyl fermions $\lambda, \psi$, and a scalar $\phi$ (which also transform in the adjoint representation of a gauge group). These can also be organised into a pair of $\mathcal{N} = 1$ multiplets, an $\mathcal{N} = 1$ vector multiplet $W = (A_\mu, \lambda)$ and chiral multiplet $\Phi = (\phi, \psi)$. Such a multiplet can be used to define Seiberg–Witten theory concisely.

The $\mathcal{N} = 2$ hypermultiplet or scalar multiplet consists of two Weyl fermions and two complex scalars, or two $\mathcal{N} = 1$ chiral multiplets.

=== N = 4 ===
The $\mathcal{N} = 4$ vector multiplet contains one gauge field, four Weyl fermions, six scalars, and CPT conjugates. This appears in N = 4 supersymmetric Yang–Mills theory.

== See also ==
- Supersymmetric gauge theory
- D-term
- F-term
