= Supermathematics =

Branch of mathematical physics

Supermathematics is the branch of mathematical physics which applies the mathematics of Lie superalgebras to the behaviour of bosons and fermions. The driving force in its formation in the 1960s and 1970s was Felix Berezin.

Objects of study include superalgebras (such as super Minkowski space and super-Poincaré algebra), superschemes, supermetrics/supersymmetry, supermanifolds, supergeometry, and supergravity, namely in the context of superstring theory.
