= Supermatrix =

In mathematics and theoretical physics, a supermatrix is a Z_{2}-graded analog of an ordinary matrix. Specifically, a supermatrix is a 2×2 block matrix with entries in a superalgebra (or superring). The most important examples are those with entries in a commutative superalgebra (such as a Grassmann algebra) or an ordinary field (thought of as a purely even commutative superalgebra).

Supermatrices arise in the study of super linear algebra where they appear as the coordinate representations of linear transformations between finite-dimensional super vector spaces or free supermodules. They have important applications in the field of supersymmetry.

== Definitions and notation ==
Let R be a fixed superalgebra (assumed to be unital and associative). Often one requires R be supercommutative as well (for essentially the same reasons as in the ungraded case).

Let p, q, r, and s be nonnegative integers. A supermatrix of dimension (r|s)×(p|q) is a matrix with entries in R that is partitioned into a 2×2 block structure

$$X = \begin{bmatrix}X_{00} & X_{01} \\ X_{10} & X_{11}\end{bmatrix}$$

with r+s total rows and p+q total columns (so that the submatrix X_{00} has dimensions r×p and X_{11} has dimensions s×q). An ordinary (ungraded) matrix can be thought of as a supermatrix for which q and s are both zero.

A square supermatrix is one for which (r|s) = (p|q). This means that not only is the unpartitioned matrix X square, but the diagonal blocks X_{00} and X_{11} are as well.

An even supermatrix is one for which the diagonal blocks (X_{00} and X_{11}) consist solely of even elements of R (i.e. homogeneous elements of parity 0) and the off-diagonal blocks (X_{01} and X_{10}) consist solely of odd elements of R.

$$\begin{bmatrix}\mathrm{even} & \mathrm{odd} \\ \mathrm{odd}& \mathrm{even} \end{bmatrix}$$

An odd supermatrix is one for which the reverse holds: the diagonal blocks are odd and the off-diagonal blocks are even.

$$\begin{bmatrix}\mathrm{odd} & \mathrm{even} \\ \mathrm{even}& \mathrm{odd} \end{bmatrix}$$

If the scalars R are purely even there are no nonzero odd elements, so the even supermatices are the block diagonal ones and the odd supermatrices are the off-diagonal ones.

A supermatrix is homogeneous if it is either even or odd. The parity, |X|, of a nonzero homogeneous supermatrix X is 0 or 1 according to whether it is even or odd. Every supermatrix can be written uniquely as the sum of an even supermatrix and an odd one.

== Algebraic structure ==
Supermatrices of compatible dimensions can be added or multiplied just as for ordinary matrices. These operations are exactly the same as the ordinary ones with the restriction that they are defined only when the blocks have compatible dimensions. One can also multiply supermatrices by elements of R (on the left or right), however, this operation differs from the ungraded case due to the presence of odd elements in R.

Let M_{r|s×p|q}(R) denote the set of all supermatrices over R with dimension (r|s)×(p|q). This set forms a supermodule over R under supermatrix addition and scalar multiplication. In particular, if R is a superalgebra over a field K then M_{r|s×p|q}(R) forms a super vector space over K.

Let M_{p|q}(R) denote the set of all square supermatices over R with dimension (p|q)×(p|q). This set forms a superring under supermatrix addition and multiplication. Furthermore, if R is a commutative superalgebra, then supermatrix multiplication is a bilinear operation, so that M_{p|q}(R) forms a superalgebra over R.

=== Addition ===
Two supermatrices of dimension (r|s)×(p|q) can be added just as in the ungraded case to obtain a supermatrix of the same dimension. The addition can be performed blockwise since the blocks have compatible sizes. It is easy to see that the sum of two even supermatrices is even and the sum of two odd supermatrices is odd.

=== Multiplication ===
One can multiply a supermatrix with dimensions (r|s)×(p|q) by a supermatrix with dimensions (p|q)×(k|l) as in the ungraded case to obtain a matrix of dimension (r|s)×(k|l). The multiplication can be performed at the block level in the obvious manner:

$$\begin{bmatrix}X_{00} & X_{01} \\ X_{10} & X_{11}\end{bmatrix}
\begin{bmatrix}Y_{00} & Y_{01} \\ Y_{10} & Y_{11}\end{bmatrix} =
\begin{bmatrix}X_{00}Y_{00} + X_{01}Y_{10} & X_{00}Y_{01} + X_{01}Y_{11} \\
X_{10}Y_{00} + X_{11}Y_{10} & X_{10}Y_{01} + X_{11}Y_{11}\end{bmatrix}.$$

Note that the blocks of the product supermatrix Z = XY are given by

$$Z_{ij} = X_{i0}Y_{0j} + X_{i1}Y_{1j}.\,$$

If X and Y are homogeneous with parities |X| and |Y| then XY is homogeneous with parity |X| + |Y|. That is, the product of two even or two odd supermatrices is even while the product of an even and odd supermatrix is odd.

=== Scalar multiplication ===
Scalar multiplication for supermatrices is different than the ungraded case due to the presence of odd elements in R. Let X be a supermatrix. Left scalar multiplication by α ∈ R is defined by

$$\alpha\cdot X = \begin{bmatrix}
\alpha\,X_{00} & \alpha\,X_{01}\\
\hat\alpha\,X_{10} & \hat\alpha\,X_{11}
\end{bmatrix}$$

where the internal scalar multiplications are the ordinary ungraded ones and $\hat\alpha$ denotes the grade involution in R. This is given on homogeneous elements by

$$\hat\alpha = (-1)^{|\alpha|}\alpha.$$

Right scalar multiplication by α is defined analogously:

$$X\cdot\alpha = \begin{bmatrix}
X_{00}\,\alpha & X_{01}\,\hat\alpha \\
X_{10}\,\alpha & X_{11}\,\hat\alpha
\end{bmatrix}.$$

If α is even then $\hat\alpha = \alpha$ and both of these operations are the same as the ungraded versions. If α and X are homogeneous then α⋅X and X⋅α are both homogeneous with parity |α| + |X|. Furthermore, if R is supercommutative then one has

$$\alpha\cdot X = (-1)^{|\alpha||X|}X\cdot\alpha.$$

== As linear transformations ==
Ordinary matrices can be thought of as the coordinate representations of linear maps between vector spaces (or free modules). Likewise, supermatrices can be thought of as the coordinate representations of linear maps between super vector spaces (or free supermodules). There is an important difference in the graded case, however. A homomorphism from one super vector space to another is, by definition, one that preserves the grading (i.e. maps even elements to even elements and odd elements to odd elements). The coordinate representation of such a transformation is always an even supermatrix. Odd supermatrices correspond to linear transformations that reverse the grading. General supermatrices represent an arbitrary ungraded linear transformation. Such transformations are still important in the graded case, although less so than the graded (even) transformations.

A supermodule M over a superalgebra R is free if it has a free homogeneous basis. If such a basis consists of p even elements and q odd elements, then M is said to have rank p|q. If R is supercommutative, the rank is independent of the choice of basis, just as in the ungraded case.

Let R^{p|q} be the space of column supervectors—supermatrices of dimension (p|q)×(1|0). This is naturally a right R-supermodule, called the right coordinate space. A supermatrix T of dimension (r|s)×(p|q) can then be thought of as a right R-linear map

$$T:R^{p|q}\to R^{r|s}\,$$

where the action of T on R^{p|q} is just supermatrix multiplication (this action is not generally left R-linear which is why we think of R^{p|q} as a right supermodule).

Let M be free right R-supermodule of rank p|q and let N be a free right R-supermodule of rank r|s. Let (e_{i}) be a free basis for M and let (f_{k}) be a free basis for N. Such a choice of bases is equivalent to a choice of isomorphisms from M to R^{p|q} and from N to R^{r|s}. Any (ungraded) linear map

$$T : M\to N\,$$

can be written as a (r|s)×(p|q) supermatrix relative to the chosen bases. The components of the associated supermatrix are determined by the formula

$$T(e_i) = \sum_{k=1}^{r+s}f_k\,{T^k}_i.$$

The block decomposition of a supermatrix T corresponds to the decomposition of M and N into even and odd submodules:

$$M = M_0\oplus M_1\qquad N = N_0\oplus N_1.$$

== Operations ==
Many operations on ordinary matrices can be generalized to supermatrices, although the generalizations are not always obvious or straightforward.

=== Supertranspose ===
The supertranspose of a supermatrix is the Z_{2}-graded analog of the transpose. Let

$$X = \begin{bmatrix}A & B \\ C & D\end{bmatrix}$$

be a homogeneous (r|s)×(p|q) supermatrix. The supertranspose of X is the (p|q)×(r|s) supermatrix

$$X^{st} = \begin{bmatrix}A^t & (-1)^{|X|}C^t \\ -(-1)^{|X|}B^t & D^t\end{bmatrix}$$

where A^{t} denotes the ordinary transpose of A. This can be extended to arbitrary supermatrices by linearity. Unlike the ordinary transpose, the supertranspose is not generally an involution, but rather has order 4. Applying the supertranspose twice to a supermatrix X gives

$$(X^{st})^{st} = \begin{bmatrix}A & -B \\ -C & D\end{bmatrix}.$$

If R is supercommutative, the supertranspose satisfies the identity

$$(XY)^{st} = (-1)^{|X||Y|}Y^{st}X^{st}.\,$$

=== Parity transpose ===
The parity transpose of a supermatrix is a new operation without an ungraded analog. Let

$$X = \begin{bmatrix}A & B \\ C & D\end{bmatrix}$$

be a (r|s)×(p|q) supermatrix. The parity transpose of X is the (s|r)×(q|p) supermatrix

$$X^\pi = \begin{bmatrix}D & C \\ B & A\end{bmatrix}.$$

That is, the (i,j) block of the transposed matrix is the (1−i,1−j) block of the original matrix.

The parity transpose operation obeys the identities

- $(X+Y)^\pi = X^\pi + Y^\pi\,$
- $(XY)^\pi = X^\pi Y^\pi\,$
- $(\alpha\cdot X)^\pi = \hat\alpha\cdot X^\pi$
- $(X\cdot\alpha)^\pi = X^\pi\cdot\hat\alpha$

as well as

- $\pi^2 = id\,$
- $\pi\circ st \circ \pi = (st)^3$

where st denotes the supertranspose operation.

=== Supertrace ===
The supertrace of a square supermatrix is the Z_{2}-graded analog of the trace. It is defined on homogeneous supermatrices by the formula

$$\mathrm{str}(X) = \mathrm{tr}(X_{00}) - (-1)^{|X|}\mathrm{tr}(X_{11})\,$$

where tr denotes the ordinary trace.

If R is supercommutative, the supertrace satisfies the identity

$$\mathrm{str}(XY) = (-1)^{|X||Y|}\mathrm{str}(YX)\,$$

for homogeneous supermatrices X and Y.

=== Berezinian ===
The Berezinian (or superdeterminant) of a square supermatrix is the Z_{2}-graded analog of the determinant. The Berezinian is only well-defined on even, invertible supermatrices over a commutative superalgebra R. In this case it is given by the formula

$$\mathrm{Ber}(X) = \det(X_{00} - X_{01}X_{11}^{-1}X_{10})\det(X_{11})^{-1}.$$

where det denotes the ordinary determinant (of square matrices with entries in the commutative algebra R_{0}).

The Berezinian satisfies similar properties to the ordinary determinant. In particular, it is multiplicative and invariant under the supertranspose. It is related to the supertrace by the formula

$$\mathrm{Ber}(e^X) = e^{\mathrm{str(X)}}.\,$$
