= Supertrace =

In the theory of superalgebras, if A is a commutative superalgebra, V is a free right A-supermodule and T is an endomorphism from V to itself, then the supertrace of T, str(T) is defined by the following trace diagram:

More concretely, if we write out T in block matrix form after the decomposition into even and odd subspaces as follows,

$$T=\begin{pmatrix}T_{00}&T_{01}\\T_{10}&T_{11}\end{pmatrix}$$

then the supertrace

str(T) = the ordinary trace of T_{00} − the ordinary trace of T_{11}.

Let us show that the supertrace does not depend on a basis. Suppose e_{1}, ..., e_{p} are the even basis vectors and e_{p+1}, ..., e_{p+q} are the odd basis vectors. Then, the components of T, which are elements of A, are defined as

$$T(\mathbf{e}_j)=\mathbf{e}_i T^i_j.\,$$

The grading of T^{i}_{j} is the sum of the gradings of T, e_{i}, e_{j} mod 2.

A change of basis to e_{1'}, ..., e_{p'}, e_{(p+1)'}, ..., e_{(p+q)'} is given by the supermatrix

$$\mathbf{e}_{i'}=\mathbf{e}_i A^i_{i'}$$

and the inverse supermatrix

$$\mathbf{e}_i=\mathbf{e}_{i'} (A^{-1})^{i'}_i,\,$$

where of course, AA^{−1} = A^{−1}A = 1 (the identity).

We can now check explicitly that the supertrace is basis independent. In the case where T is even, we have

$$\operatorname{str}(A^{-1} T A)=(-1)^{|i'|} (A^{-1})^{i'}_j T^j_k A^k_{i'}=(-1)^{|i'|}(-1)^{(|i'|+|j|)(|i'|+|j|)}T^j_k A^k_{i'} (A^{-1})^{i'}_j=(-1)^{|j|} T^j_j
=\operatorname{str}(T).$$

In the case where T is odd, we have

$$\operatorname{str}(A^{-1} T A)=(-1)^{|i'|} (A^{-1})^{i'}_j T^j_k A^k_{i'}=(-1)^{|i'|}(-1)^{(1+|j|+|k|)(|i'|+|j|)}T^j_k (A^{-1})^{i'}_j A^k_{i'} =(-1)^{|j|} T^j_j
=\operatorname{str}(T).$$

The supertrace satisfies the property

$$\operatorname{str}(T_1 T_2) = (-1)^{|T_1||T_2|} \operatorname{str}(T_2 T_1)$$

for all T_{1}, T_{2} in End(V). In particular, the supertrace of a supercommutator is zero.

In fact, one can define a supertrace more generally for any associative superalgebra E over a commutative superalgebra A as a linear map tr: E -> A which vanishes on supercommutators. Such a supertrace is not uniquely defined; it can always at least be modified by multiplication by an element of A.

== Physics applications ==
In supersymmetric quantum field theories, in which the action integral is invariant under a set of symmetry transformations (known as supersymmetry transformations) whose algebras are superalgebras, the supertrace has a variety of applications. In such a context, the supertrace of the mass matrix for the theory can be written as a sum over spins of the traces of the mass matrices for particles of different spin:

$$\operatorname{str}[M^2]=\sum_s(-1)^{2s} (2s+1)\operatorname{tr}[m_s^2].$$

In anomaly-free theories where only renormalizable terms appear in the superpotential, the above supertrace can be shown to vanish, even when supersymmetry is spontaneously broken.

The contribution to the effective potential arising at one loop (sometimes referred to as the Coleman–Weinberg potential) can also be written in terms of a supertrace. If $M$ is the mass matrix for a given theory, the one-loop potential can be written as

$$V_{eff}^{1-loop}=\dfrac{1}{64\pi^2}\operatorname{str}\bigg[M^4\ln\Big(\dfrac{M^2}{\Lambda^2}\Big)\bigg] =
\dfrac{1}{64\pi^2}\operatorname{tr}\bigg[m_{B}^4\ln\Big(\dfrac{m_{B}^2}{\Lambda^2}\Big)-
m_{F}^4\ln\Big(\dfrac{m_{F}^2}{\Lambda^2}\Big)\bigg]$$

where $m_B$ and $m_F$ are the respective tree-level mass matrices for the separate bosonic and fermionic degrees of freedom in the theory and $\Lambda$ is a cutoff scale.

== See also ==
- Berezinian
