= Pre-Lie algebra =

In mathematics, a pre-Lie algebra is an algebraic structure on a vector space that describes some properties of objects such as rooted trees and vector fields on affine space.

The notion of pre-Lie algebra has been introduced by Murray Gerstenhaber in his work on deformations of algebras.

Pre-Lie algebras have been considered under some other names, among which one can cite left-symmetric algebras, right-symmetric algebras or Vinberg algebras.

== Definition ==
A pre-Lie algebra $(V,\triangleleft)$ is a vector space $V$ with a linear map $\triangleleft : V \otimes V \to V$, satisfying the relation $(x \triangleleft y) \triangleleft z - x \triangleleft (y \triangleleft z) = (x \triangleleft z) \triangleleft y - x \triangleleft (z \triangleleft y).$

This identity can be seen as the invariance of the associator $(x,y,z) = (x \triangleleft y) \triangleleft z - x \triangleleft (y \triangleleft z)$ under the exchange of the two variables $y$ and $z$.

Every associative algebra is hence also a pre-Lie algebra, as the associator vanishes identically. Although weaker than associativity, the defining relation of a pre-Lie algebra still implies that the commutator $x \triangleleft y - y \triangleleft x$ is a Lie bracket. In particular, the Jacobi identity for the commutator follows from cycling the $x,y,z$ terms in the defining relation for pre-Lie algebras, above.

== Examples ==
=== Vector fields on an affine space ===
Let $U \subset \mathbb{R}^n$ be an open neighborhood of $\mathbb{R}^n$, parameterised by variables $x_1,\cdots,x_n$. Given vector fields $u = u_i \partial_{x_i}$, $v = v_j \partial_{x_j}$ we define $u \triangleleft v = v_j \frac{\partial u_i}{\partial x_j} \partial_{x_i}$.

The difference between $(u \triangleleft v) \triangleleft w$ and $u \triangleleft (v \triangleleft w)$, is $(u \triangleleft v) \triangleleft w - u \triangleleft (v \triangleleft w) = v_j w_k \frac{\partial^2 u_i}{\partial x_j \partial x_k}\partial_{x_i}$ which is symmetric in $v$ and $w$. Thus $\triangleleft$ defines a pre-Lie algebra structure.

Given a manifold $M$ and homeomorphisms $\phi, \phi'$ from $U,U' \subset \mathbb{R}^n$ to overlapping open neighborhoods of $M$, they each define a pre-Lie algebra structure $\triangleleft, \triangleleft'$ on vector fields defined on the overlap. Whilst $\triangleleft$ need not agree with $\triangleleft'$, their commutators do agree: $u \triangleleft v - v \triangleleft u = u \triangleleft' v - v \triangleleft' u = [v,u]$, the Lie bracket of $v$ and $u$.

=== Rooted trees ===
Let $\mathbb{T}$ be the free vector space spanned by all rooted trees.

One can introduce a bilinear product $\curvearrowleft$ on $\mathbb{T}$ as follows. Let $\tau_1$ and $\tau_2$ be two rooted trees.

$$\tau_1 \curvearrowleft \tau_2 = \sum_{s \in \mathrm{Vertices}(\tau_1)} \tau_1 \circ_s \tau_2$$

where $\tau_1 \circ_s \tau_2$ is the rooted tree obtained by adding to the disjoint union of $\tau_1$ and $\tau_2$ an edge going from the vertex $s$ of $\tau_1$ to the root vertex of $\tau_2$.

Then $(\mathbb{T}, \curvearrowleft)$ is a free pre-Lie algebra on one generator. More generally, the free pre-Lie algebra on any set of generators is constructed the same way from trees with each vertex labelled by one of the generators.
