= Berezinian =

In mathematics and theoretical physics, the Berezinian or superdeterminant is a generalization of the determinant to the case of supermatrices. The name is for Felix Berezin. The Berezinian plays a role analogous to the determinant when considering coordinate changes for integration on a supermanifold.

== Definition ==
The Berezinian is uniquely determined by two defining properties:

- $\operatorname{Ber}(XY) = \operatorname{Ber}(X)\operatorname{Ber}(Y)$
- $\operatorname{Ber}(e^X) = e^{\operatorname{str(X)}}\,$

where str(X) denotes the supertrace of X. Unlike the classical determinant, the Berezinian is defined only for invertible supermatrices.

The simplest case to consider is the Berezinian of a supermatrix with entries in a field K. Such supermatrices represent linear transformations of a super vector space over K. A particular even supermatrix is a block matrix of the form

$$X = \begin{bmatrix}A & 0 \\ 0 & D\end{bmatrix}$$

Such a matrix is invertible if and only if both A and D are invertible matrices over K. The Berezinian of X is given by

$$\operatorname{Ber}(X) = \det(A)\det(D)^{-1}$$

For a motivation of the negative exponent see the substitution formula in the odd case.

More generally, consider matrices with entries in a supercommutative algebra R. An even supermatrix is then of the form

$$X = \begin{bmatrix}A & B \\ C & D\end{bmatrix}$$

where A and D have even entries and B and C have odd entries. Such a matrix is invertible if and only if both A and D are invertible in the commutative ring R_{0} (the even subalgebra of R). In this case the Berezinian is given by

$$\operatorname{Ber}(X) = \det(A-BD^{-1}C)\det(D)^{-1}$$

or, equivalently, by

$$\operatorname{Ber}(X) = \det(A)\det(D-CA^{-1}B)^{-1}.$$

These formulas are well-defined since we are only taking determinants of matrices whose entries are in the commutative ring R_{0}. The matrix

$$D-CA^{-1}B \,$$

is known as the Schur complement of A relative to
$$\begin{bmatrix} A & B \\ C & D \end{bmatrix}.$$

An odd matrix X can only be invertible if the number of even dimensions equals the number of odd dimensions. In this case, invertibility of X is equivalent to the invertibility of JX, where

$$J = \begin{bmatrix}0 & I \\ -I & 0\end{bmatrix}.$$

Then the Berezinian of X is defined as

$$\operatorname{Ber}(X) = \operatorname{Ber}(JX) = \det(C-DB^{-1}A)\det(-B)^{-1}.$$

== Properties ==
- The Berezinian of $X$ is always a unit in the ring R_{0}.
- $\operatorname{Ber}(X^{-1}) = \operatorname{Ber}(X)^{-1}$
- $\operatorname{Ber}(X^{st}) = \operatorname{Ber}(X)$ where $X^{st}$ denotes the supertranspose of $X$.
- $\operatorname{Ber}(X\oplus Y) = \operatorname{Ber}(X)\mathrm{Ber}(Y)$

== Berezinian module ==
The determinant of an endomorphism of a free module M can be defined as the induced action on the 1-dimensional highest exterior power of M. In the supersymmetric case there is no highest exterior power, but there is a still a similar definition of the Berezinian as follows.

Suppose that M is a free module of dimension (p,q) over R. Let A be the (super)symmetric algebra S*(M*) of the dual M* of M. Then an automorphism of M acts on the ext module

$$Ext_{A}^p (R,A)$$

(which has dimension (1,0) if q is even and dimension (0,1) if q is odd)) as multiplication by the Berezinian.

== See also ==
- Berezin integration
