= Berezin integral =

Integration for Grassmann variables

In mathematical physics, the Berezin integral, named after Felix Berezin (also known as Grassmann integral, after Hermann Grassmann) is a way to define integration for functions of Grassmann variables (elements of the exterior algebra). It is not an integral in the Lebesgue sense; the word "integral" is used because the Berezin integral has properties analogous to the Lebesgue integral and because it extends the path integral in physics, where it is used as a sum over histories for fermions.

== Definition ==
Let $\Lambda^n$ be the exterior algebra of polynomials in anticommuting elements $\theta_{1},\dots,\theta_{n}$ over the field of complex numbers. (The ordering of the generators $\theta_1,\dots,\theta_n$ is fixed and defines the orientation of the exterior algebra.)

=== One variable ===
The Berezin integral over the sole Grassmann variable $\theta = \theta_1$ is defined to be a linear functional

$$\int [af(\theta)+bg(\theta)] \, d\theta = a\int f(\theta) \, d\theta + b\int g(\theta) \, d\theta, \quad a,b \in \C$$

where we define

$$\int \theta \, d\theta = 1, \qquad \int \, d\theta = 0$$

so that :

$$\int \frac\partial{\partial\theta}f(\theta)\,d\theta = 0.$$

These properties define the integral uniquely and imply

$$\int (a\theta+b)\, d\theta = a, \quad a,b \in \C.$$

Take note that $f(\theta)=a\theta + b$ is the most general function of $\theta$ because Grassmann variables square to zero, so $f(\theta)$ cannot have non-zero terms beyond linear order.

=== Multiple variables ===
The Berezin integral on $\Lambda^{n}$ is defined to be the unique linear functional $\int_{\Lambda^{n} }\cdot\textrm{d}\theta$ with the following properties:

$$\int_{\Lambda^n}\theta_{n}\cdots\theta_{1}\,\mathrm{d}\theta=1,$$
$$\int_{\Lambda^n}\frac{\partial f}{\partial\theta_{i}}\,\mathrm{d}\theta=0,\ i=1,\dots,n$$

for any $f\in\Lambda^n,$ where $\partial/\partial\theta_{i}$ means the left or the right partial derivative. These properties define the integral uniquely.

Notice that different conventions exist in the literature: Some authors define instead

$$\int_{\Lambda^n}\theta_{1}\cdots\theta_{n}\,\mathrm{d}\theta:=1.$$

The formula

$$\int_{\Lambda^n}f(\theta) \, \mathrm{d}\theta=\int_{\Lambda^1}\left( \cdots \int_{\Lambda^1}\left(\int_{\Lambda^1}f(\theta) \, \mathrm{d}\theta_{1}\right) \, \mathrm{d}\theta_2 \cdots \right)\mathrm{d}\theta_n$$

expresses the Fubini law. On the right-hand side, the interior integral of a monomial $f=g(\theta')\theta_{1}$ is set to be $g( \theta'),$ where $\theta'=\left(\theta_{2},\ldots,\theta_{n}\right)$; the integral of $f=g (\theta')$ vanishes. The integral with respect to $\theta_{2}$ is calculated in the similar way and so on.

=== Change of Grassmann variables ===
Let $\theta_{i}=\theta_{i}\left(\xi_{1},\ldots,\xi_{n}\right),\ i=1,\ldots,n,$ be odd polynomials in some antisymmetric variables $\xi_{1},\ldots,\xi_{n}$. The Jacobian is the matrix

$$D=\left\{ \frac{\partial\theta_{i}}{\partial\xi_{j}},\ i,j=1, \ldots, n\right\},$$

where $\partial /\partial\xi_{j}$ refers to the right derivative ($\partial(\theta_1\theta_2) /\partial\theta_2 = \theta_1, \; \partial(\theta_1\theta_2) /\partial\theta_1 = -\theta_2$). The formula for the coordinate change reads

$$\int f(\theta) \, \mathrm{d}\theta=\int f(\theta( \xi))(\det D)^{-1} \, \mathrm{d}\xi.$$

== Integrating even and odd variables ==
=== Definition ===
Consider now the algebra $\Lambda^{m\mid n}$ of functions of real commuting variables $x=x_{1},\ldots,x_{m}$ and of anticommuting variables $\theta_{1},\ldots,\theta_{n}$ (which is called the free superalgebra of dimension $(m|n)$). Intuitively, a function $f=f(x,\theta) \in\Lambda^{m\mid n}$ is a function of m even (bosonic, commuting) variables and of n odd (fermionic, anti-commuting) variables. More formally, an element $f=f(x,\theta) \in\Lambda^{m\mid n}$ is a function of the argument $x$ that varies in an open set $X\subset\R^{m}$ with values in the algebra $\Lambda^{n}.$ Suppose that this function is continuous and vanishes in the complement of a compact set $K\subset\R^{m}.$ The Berezin integral is the number

$$\int_{\Lambda^{m\mid n}} f(x,\theta) \, \mathrm{d}\theta \, \mathrm{d}x=\int_{\R^m} \, \mathrm{d}x \int_{\Lambda^n} f(x,\theta) \, \mathrm{d}\theta.$$

=== Change of even and odd variables ===
Let a coordinate transformation be given by $x_i=x_i (y,\xi),\ i=1,\ldots,m;\ \theta_j=\theta_j (y,\xi),j=1,\ldots, n,$ where $x_i$ are even and $\theta_j$ are odd polynomials of $\xi$ depending on even variables $y.$ The Jacobian matrix of this transformation has the block form:

$$\mathrm{J}=\frac{\partial(x,\theta)}{\partial (y,\xi)}= \begin{pmatrix} A & B\\ C & D\end{pmatrix},$$

where each even derivative $\partial/\partial y_{j}$ commutes with all elements of the algebra $\Lambda^{m\mid n}$; the odd derivatives commute with even elements and anticommute with odd elements. The entries of the diagonal blocks $A=\partial x/\partial y$ and $D=\partial\theta/\partial\xi$ are even and the entries of the off-diagonal blocks $B=\partial x/\partial \xi,\ C=\partial\theta/\partial y$ are odd functions, where $\partial /\partial\xi_{j}$ again mean right derivatives.

When the function $D$ is invertible in $\Lambda^{m\mid n},$

$$\mathrm{J}=\frac{\partial(x,\theta)}{\partial (y,\xi)}= \begin{pmatrix} A & B\\ C & D\end{pmatrix}
= {\begin{pmatrix}I&B\\0&D\end{pmatrix}}{\begin{pmatrix}A-BD^{-1}C&0\\D^{-1}C&I\end{pmatrix}}$$

So we have the Berezinian (or superdeterminant) of the matrix $\mathrm{J}$, which is the even function

$$\operatorname{Ber} \mathrm{J} =\det\left( A-BD^{-1}C\right) (\det D)^{-1}$$

Suppose that the real functions $x_i=x_i(y,0)$ define a smooth invertible map $F:Y\to X$ of open sets $X, Y$ in $\R^m$ and the linear part of the map $\xi\mapsto\theta=\theta(y,\xi)$ is invertible for each $y\in Y.$ The general transformation law for the Berezin integral reads

$$\begin{align}
& \int_{\Lambda^{m\mid n}}f(x,\theta) \, \mathrm{d}\theta \, \mathrm{d}x = \int_{\Lambda^{m\mid n}} f(x(y,\xi),\theta (y,\xi)) \varepsilon \operatorname{Ber} \mathrm{J} \, \mathrm{d} \xi \, \mathrm{d}y \\[6pt]
= {} &\int_{\Lambda^{m\mid n}} f (x(y,\xi),\theta (y,\xi)) \varepsilon \frac{\det\left(A-BD^{-1}C\right)}{\det D} \, \mathrm{d}\xi \, \mathrm{d}y,
\end{align}$$

where $\varepsilon=\mathrm{sgn}(\det\partial x(y,0)/\partial y$) is the sign of the orientation of the map $F.$ The superposition $f(x(y,\xi),\theta(y,\xi))$ is defined in the obvious way, if the functions $x_{i}(y,\xi)$ do not depend on $\xi.$ In the general case, we write $x_{i}(y,\xi) =x_{i}(y,0)+\delta_{i},$ where $\delta_{i}, i=1,\ldots,m$ are even nilpotent elements of $\Lambda^{m\mid n}$ and set

$$f(x(y,\xi),\theta) =f(x(y,0),\theta) +\sum_i\frac{\partial f}{\partial x_{i}}(x(y,0),\theta) \delta_{i}+\frac{1}{2} \sum_{i,j} \frac{\partial^{2}f}{\partial x_i \, \partial x_j}(x(y,0),\theta) \delta_i\delta_j+ \cdots,$$

where the Taylor series is finite.

== Useful formulas ==
The following formulas for Gaussian integrals are used often in the path integral formulation of quantum field theory:

- $\int \exp\left[-\theta^TA\eta\right] \,d\theta\,d\eta = \det A$

with $A$ being a complex $n \times n$ matrix.

- $$\int \exp\left[- \tfrac{1}{2} \theta^T M \theta\right] \,d\theta = \begin{cases} \mathrm{Pf}\, M & n \mbox{ even} \\ 0 & n \mbox{ odd} \end{cases}$$

with $M$ being a complex skew-symmetric $n \times n$ matrix, and $\mathrm{Pf}\, M$ being the Pfaffian of $M$, which fulfills $(\mathrm{Pf}\, M)^2 = \det M$.

In the above formulas the notation $d \theta = d\theta_1\cdots \, d\theta_n$ is used. From these formulas, other useful formulas follow (See Appendix A in) :

- $\int \exp\left[\theta^TA\eta +\theta^T J + K^T \eta \right] \,d\eta_1\,d\theta_1\dots d\eta_n d\theta_n = \det A \,\,\exp[-K^T A^{-1} J ]$

with $A$ being an invertible $n \times n$ matrix. Note that these integrals are all in the form of a partition function.

== History ==
Berezin integration was probably first presented by David John Candlin in 1956. Unfortunately Candlin's article failed to attract notice, and has been buried in oblivion.

Later it was independently discovered by Felix Berezin in 1966. Berezin's work came to be widely known, and has almost been cited universally, (Note: For example many famous textbooks of quantum field theory cite Berezin. One exception was Stanley Mandelstam who is said to have used to cite Candlin's work.) becoming an indispensable tool to treat quantum field theory of fermions by functional integral.

Other authors contributed to these developments, including the physicists Isaak Khalatnikov (although his paper contains mistakes), Paul Taunton Matthews and Abdus Salam, and J. L. Martin.

== See also ==
- Supermanifold
- Berezinian
