= Poisson algebra =

Associative algebra together with a Lie bracket that satisfies Leibniz's law

In mathematics, a Poisson algebra is an associative algebra together with a Lie bracket that also satisfies Leibniz's law; that is, the bracket is also a derivation. Poisson algebras appear naturally in Hamiltonian mechanics, and are also central in the study of quantum groups. Manifolds with a Poisson algebra structure are known as Poisson manifolds, of which the symplectic manifolds and the Poisson–Lie groups are a special case. The algebra is named in honour of Siméon Denis Poisson.

== Definition ==
A Poisson algebra is a vector space over a field K equipped with two bilinear products, ⋅ and {, }, having the following properties:

- The product ⋅ forms an associative K-algebra.
- The product {, }, called the Poisson bracket, forms a Lie algebra, and so it is anti-symmetric, and obeys the Jacobi identity.
- The Poisson bracket acts as a derivation of the associative product ⋅, so that for any three elements x, y and z in the algebra, one has {x, y ⋅ z} = {x, y} ⋅ z + y ⋅ {x, z}.

The last property often allows a variety of different formulations of the algebra to be given, as noted in the examples below.

== Examples ==
Poisson algebras occur in various settings.

=== Symplectic manifolds ===
The space of real-valued smooth functions over a symplectic manifold forms a Poisson algebra. On a symplectic manifold, every real-valued function H on the manifold induces a vector field X_{H}, the Hamiltonian vector field. Then, given any two smooth functions F and G over the symplectic manifold, the Poisson bracket may be defined as:

$$\{F,G\}=dG(X_F) = X_F(G)\,$$.

This definition is consistent in part because the Poisson bracket acts as a derivation. Equivalently, one may define the bracket {,} as

$$X_{\{F,G\}}=[X_F,X_G]\,$$

where [,] is the Lie derivative. When the symplectic manifold is R^{2n} with the standard symplectic structure, then the Poisson bracket takes on the well-known form

$$\{F,G\}=\sum_{i=1}^n \frac{\partial F}{\partial q_i}\frac{\partial G}{\partial p_i}-\frac{\partial F}{\partial p_i}\frac{\partial G}{\partial q_i}.$$

Similar considerations apply for Poisson manifolds, which generalize symplectic manifolds by allowing the symplectic bivector to be rank deficient.

=== Lie algebras ===
The tensor algebra of a Lie algebra has a Poisson algebra structure. A very explicit construction of this is given in the article on universal enveloping algebras.

The construction proceeds by first building the tensor algebra of the underlying vector space of the Lie algebra. The tensor algebra is simply the disjoint union (direct sum ⊕) of all tensor products of this vector space. One can then show that the Lie bracket can be consistently lifted to the entire tensor algebra: it obeys both the product rule, and the Jacobi identity of the Poisson bracket, and thus is the Poisson bracket, when lifted. The pair of products {,} and ⊗ then form a Poisson algebra. Observe that ⊗ is neither commutative nor is it anti-commutative: it is merely associative.

Thus, one has the general statement that the tensor algebra of any Lie algebra is a Poisson algebra. The universal enveloping algebra is obtained by modding out the Poisson algebra structure.

=== Associative algebras ===
If A is an associative algebra, then imposing the commutator [x, y] = xy − yx turns it into a Poisson algebra (and thus, also a Lie algebra) A_{L}. Note that the resulting A_{L} should not be confused with the tensor algebra construction described in the previous section. If one wished, one could also apply that construction as well, but that would give a different Poisson algebra, one that would be much larger.

=== Vertex operator algebras ===
For a vertex operator algebra (V, Y, ω, 1), the space V/C_{2}(V) is a Poisson algebra with {a, b} = a_{0}b and a ⋅ b = a_{−1}b. For certain vertex operator algebras, these Poisson algebras are finite-dimensional.

=== Z_{2} grading ===
Poisson algebras can be given a Z_{2}-grading in one of two different ways. These two result in the Poisson superalgebra and the Gerstenhaber algebra. The difference between the two is in the grading of the product itself. For the Poisson superalgebra, the grading is given by

$$|\{a,b\}| = |a|+|b|$$

whereas in the Gerstenhaber algebra, the bracket decreases the grading by one:

$$|\{a,b\}| = |a|+|b| - 1$$

In both of these expressions $|a|=\deg a$ denotes the grading of the element $a$; typically, it counts how $a$ can be decomposed into an even or odd product of generating elements. Gerstenhaber algebras conventionally occur in BRST quantization.

== See also ==
- Moyal bracket
- Kontsevich quantization formula
