= Braid algebra =

A braid algebra can be:

- A Gerstenhaber algebra (also called an antibracket algebra).
- An algebra related to the braid group.
