= Connection (algebraic framework) =

Geometry of quantum systems (e.g., noncommutative geometry and supergeometry) is mainly phrased in algebraic terms of modules and algebras. Connections on modules are generalization of a linear connection on a smooth vector bundle $E\to X$ written as a Koszul connection on the $C^\infty(X)$-module of sections of $E\to X$.

== Commutative algebra ==
Let $A$ be a commutative ring and $M$ an A-module. There are different equivalent definitions of a connection on $M$.

=== First definition ===
If $k \to A$ is a ring homomorphism, a $k$-linear connection is a $k$-linear morphism

$$\nabla: M \to \Omega^1_{A/k} \otimes_A M$$

which satisfies the identity

$$\nabla(am) = da \otimes m + a \nabla m$$

A connection extends, for all $p \geq 0$ to a unique map

$$\nabla: \Omega^p_{A/k} \otimes_A M \to  \Omega^{p+1}_{A/k} \otimes_A M$$

satisfying $\nabla(\omega \otimes f) = d\omega \otimes f + (-1)^p \omega \wedge \nabla f$. A connection is said to be integrable if $\nabla \circ \nabla = 0$, or equivalently, if the curvature $\nabla^2: M \to \Omega_{A/k}^2 \otimes M$ vanishes.

=== Second definition ===
Let $D(A)$ be the module of derivations of a ring $A$. A connection on an A-module $M$ is defined as an A-module morphism

$$\nabla:D(A) \to \mathrm{Diff}_1(M,M); u \mapsto \nabla_u$$

such that the first order differential operators $\nabla_u$ on $M$ obey the Leibniz rule

$$\nabla_u(ap)=u(a)p+a\nabla_u(p), \quad a\in A, \quad p\in
M.$$

Connections on a module over a commutative ring always exist.

The curvature of the connection $\nabla$ is defined as the zero-order differential operator

$$R(u,u')=[\nabla_u,\nabla_{u'}]-\nabla_{[u,u']} \,$$

on the module $M$ for all $u,u'\in D(A)$.

If $E\to X$ is a vector bundle, there is one-to-one correspondence between linear connections $\Gamma$ on $E\to X$ and the connections $\nabla$ on the $C^\infty(X)$-module of sections of $E\to X$. Strictly speaking, $\nabla$ corresponds to the covariant differential of a connection on $E\to X$.

== Graded commutative algebra ==
The notion of a connection on modules over commutative rings is straightforwardly extended to modules over a graded commutative algebra. This is the case of superconnections in supergeometry of graded manifolds and supervector bundles. Superconnections always exist.

== Noncommutative algebra ==
If $A$ is a noncommutative ring, connections on left and right A-modules are defined similarly to those on modules over commutative rings. However these connections need not exist.

In contrast with connections on left and right modules, there is a problem how to define a connection on an R-S-bimodule over noncommutative rings R and S. There are different definitions of such a connection. Let us mention one of them. A connection on an R-S-bimodule $P$ is defined as a bimodule morphism

$$\nabla:D(A)\ni u\to \nabla_u\in \mathrm{Diff}_1(P,P)$$

which obeys the Leibniz rule

$$\nabla_u(apb)=u(a)pb+a\nabla_u(p)b +apu(b), \quad a\in R,
\quad b\in S, \quad p\in P.$$

== See also ==
- Connection (vector bundle)
- Connection (mathematics)
- Noncommutative geometry
- Supergeometry
- Differential calculus over commutative algebras
