= Ternary commutator =

In mathematical physics, the ternary commutator is an additional ternary operation on a triple system defined by

$$[a,b,c] = abc-acb-bac+bca+cab-cba. \,$$

Also called the ternutator or alternating ternary sum, it is a special case of the n-commutator for n = 3, whereas the 2-commutator is the ordinary commutator.

== Properties ==
- When one or more of a, b, c is equal to 0, [a, b, c] is also 0. This statement makes 0 the absorbing element of the ternary commutator.
  - The same happens when a = b = c.
