= Murray Gerstenhaber =

American mathematician (1927–2024)

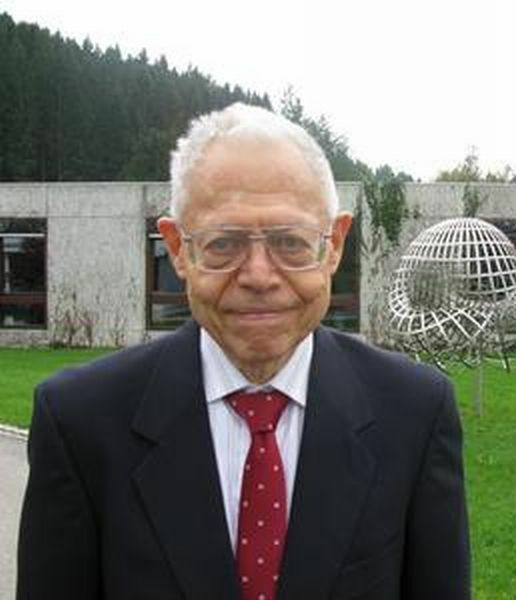
- Gerstenhaber in 2010
- Born: June 5, 1927; Brooklyn, New York, U.S.
- Died: February 21, 2024 (aged 96)
- Citizenship: American
- Education: Yale University (BS); University of Chicago (MA, PhD); University of Pennsylvania (JD)
- Occupations: Mathematician, professor of mathematics, lawyer, lecturer in law
- Known for: Gerstenhaber algebra; Pre-Lie algebra
- Spouse: Ruth Priscilla Zager
- Children: 3
- Parent(s): Pauline (née Rosenzweig) and Joseph Gerstenhaber
- Awards: Fellow of the American Mathematical Society
- Scientific career
- Fields: Theoretical physics
- Workplaces: University of Pennsylvania
- Thesis: Rings of Derivations (1951)
- Doctoral advisor: Abraham Adrian Albert

Murray Gerstenhaber (June 5, 1927 – February 21, 2024) was an American mathematician, physicist, and lawyer. He was a professor of mathematics at the University of Pennsylvania, best known for his contributions to theoretical physics with his discovery of Gerstenhaber algebra. He was also a lecturer in law at the University of Pennsylvania Law School.

== Early life and education ==
Murray Gerstenhaber was born in Brooklyn, New York, to Jewish immigrants Pauline (née Rosenzweig; who was born in Romania; died in 1978) and Joseph Gerstenhaber (who was born in 1892 in Romania; died in 1975). His father was trained as a jeweler, "but being unable to find work in this line he [took] employment in a factory making airplane precision instruments”. As to his mother, in 2015 he noted:

"For someone born into a minority family without means, I have been exceedingly lucky. The problems faced by talented but disadvantaged children today are preventing many who could be important contributors to the sciences, arts, and society in general, from achieving their potential. They don’t all have mothers like mine, who fought to find a path to education for her child. We have to seek them out but are not doing enough to find them, bring them out of isolation, and give them the opportunities I was so fortunate to have enjoyed."

Gerstenhaber was a child prodigy who was profiled in Leta Hollingworth's book Children Above 180 IQ (1942). In this book, Gerstenhaber was dubbed "Child L," and his prodigious abilities and personality traits were described in great detail. At age 9 years 5 months, a Stanford-Binet test showed him to have a mental age of between 17 and 18 and an IQ between 195 and 198. A second revised Stanford-Binet given a year later found him to have a mental age of 19 years 11 months and an IQ of 199+.

Gerstenhaber attended the now-defunct Speyer School, a school for rapid learners in New York City. Many years later, his daughter-in-law co-founded Speyer Legacy School, naming the new school after the original. After graduating from Speyer School, Gerstenhaber entered the Bronx High School of Science in 1940. From 1945 to 1947 he served in the infantry in the United States Army as a corporal assigned to the Office of Military Government for Germany.

Gerstenhaber finished his B.S. in mathematics at Yale University (1948). At Yale, he participated in the William Lowell Putnam Mathematical Competition and was on the team representing Yale University (along with Murray Gell-Mann and Henry O. Pollak) that won the second prize in 1947; each of them received a monetary prize of $30 ($430 in current dollar terms). His 1948 participation in the competition earned him a Top 10 ranking.

Gerstenhaber earned an M.A. and a Ph.D. (1951) in mathematics from the University of Chicago, under the instruction of Abraham Adrian Albert. Gerstenhaber's dissertation was entitled Rings of Derivations.

Gerstenhaber earned a J.D. from the University of Pennsylvania Law School in 1973, and was admitted to the Pennsylvania bar in 1974.

== Career ==
Gerstenhaber was an assistant professor in the Department of Mathematics at the University of Pennsylvania from 1953 to 1958, rising to associate professor (1958–61), and full professor (1961–2024) and chairman. His research interests include: algebraic deformation theory, universal algebra, quantum groups, and statistics for law. He is best known for his contributions to theoretical physics with his discovery of Gerstenhaber algebra.

Among his writings were Algebraic cohomology and deformation theory, with SD Schack, Deformation theory of algebras and structures and applications, 11–264 (1988), "On the deformation of rings and algebras," Annals of Mathematics, Second Series, Vol. 79, No. 1 (Jan., 1964), pp. 59–103, and "The cohomology structure of an associative ring," Annals of Mathematics, Second Series, Vol. 78, 267–288 (1963). For these last two papers he received in 2021 the Leroy P. Steele Prize for Seminal Contribution to Research. Gerstenhaber noted in 1990: “The ability to hang in there has a lot to do with scientific productivity, I am convinced. And in mathematics … hanging in there is a solitary accomplishment.”

Gerstenhaber was chairman of the faculty senate at the University of Pennsylvania from 1982 to 1983.

Gerstenhaber was also a lecturer in law at the University of Pennsylvania Law School, teaching a seminar on statistics for law.

In 2012 he became a fellow of the American Mathematical Society, and was a member of its council. Gerstenhaber was the managing editor of the Bulletin of the American Mathematical Society. Gerstenhaber was also a Fellow of the American Association for the Advancement of Science.

In 2021 he received the Steele Prize for Seminal Contribution to Research.

== Personal life ==
Gerstenhaber married Ruth Priscilla Zager on June 3, 1956, in the Spanish and Portuguese Synagogue in New York City. They lived in Merion Station, Pennsylvania, and Haverford, Pennsylvania, and had three children: Jeremy M. Gerstenhaber, David Ezra Gerstenhaber (now founder, president, and portfolio manager at Argonaut Management), and Rachel Rebecca Stern (now general counsel and head of strategic resources of FactSet). His son David, a hedge fund manager and Tiger Management alumnus, is married to financier Steven Posner's daughter Kelly.

Gerstenhaber died on February 21, 2024, at the age of 96.

== See also ==
- Nilpotent orbit
- Purely inseparable extension
