= Poisson superalgebra =

Z2-graded generalization of a Poisson algebra

In mathematics, a Poisson superalgebra is a $\mathbb{Z}_2$-graded associative unital algebra $A = A_0 \oplus A_1$ that is equipped with a second bilinear map,

$$[\cdot,\cdot] : A\times A\to A$$.

Let $|x|$ denote the parity of a homogeneous element $x$, then $\forall x,y,z \in A$ the bracket satisfies:

- Graded Antisymmetry: $[x,y] = - (-1)^{|x||y|} [y,x]$.
- Graded Jacobi Idenitity: $[x,[y,z]] = [[x,y],z] + (-1)^{|x||y|}[y,[x,z]]$.
- Graded Leibniz Rule: $[x,yz] = [x,y]z + (-1)^{|x||y|} y[x,z]$.

This is one of two possible ways of "super"izing the Poisson algebra. This gives the classical dynamics of fermion fields and classical spin-1/2 particles. The other way is to define an antibracket algebra or Gerstenhaber algebra, used in the BRST and Batalin-Vilkovisky formalism. The difference between these two is in the grading of the Lie bracket. In the Poisson superalgebra, the grading of the bracket is zero:

$$|[a,b]| = |a|+|b|$$

whereas in the Gerstenhaber algebra, the bracket decreases the grading by one:

$$|[a,b]| = |a|+|b| - 1$$

== Examples ==
- If $A$ is any associative $\mathbb{Z}_2$-graded algebra, then, defining a new product $[\cdot,\cdot]$, called the super-commutator, by $[x,y]:=xy-(-1)^{|x||y|}yx$ for any pure graded x, y, turns $A$ into a Poisson superalgebra.
- The algebra $C^\infty(P)$ of smooth functions of a symplectic manifold $(P,\Omega)$ is a Poisson Superalgebra if we set $A_1 = 0$.

== See also ==
- Poisson supermanifold
