= Representation of a Lie superalgebra =

Semigroup action

In the mathematical field of representation theory, a representation of a Lie superalgebra L is an action of Lie superalgebra L on a Z_{2}-graded vector space V, such that if A and B are any two pure elements of L and X and Y are any two pure elements of V, then

(c_{1}A + c_{2}B) · X = c_{1}A · X + c_{2}B · X
A · (c_{1}X + c_{2}Y) = c_{1}A · X + c_{2}A · Y
(−1)^{A·X} = (−1)^{A}(−1)^{X}
[A,B] · X = A · (B · X) − (−1)^{AB}B · (A · X).

Equivalently, a representation of L is a Z_{2}-graded representation of the universal enveloping algebra of L which respects the third equation above.

== Unitary representation of a star Lie superalgebra ==
A * Lie superalgebra is a complex Lie superalgebra equipped with an involutive antilinear map * such that * respects the grading and

[a,b]*=[b*,a*].

A unitary representation of such a Lie algebra is a Z_{2} graded Hilbert space which is a representation of a Lie superalgebra as above together with the requirement that self-adjoint elements of the Lie superalgebra are represented by Hermitian transformations.

This is a major concept in the study of supersymmetry together with representation of a Lie superalgebra on an algebra. Say A is an *-algebra representation of the Lie superalgebra (together with the additional requirement that * respects the grading and L[a]*=-(-1)^{La}L*[a*]) and H is the unitary rep and also, H is a unitary representation of A.

These three reps are all compatible if for pure elements a in A, |ψ> in H and L in the Lie superalgebra,

L[a|ψ>)]=(L[a])|ψ>+(-1)^{La}a(L[|ψ>]).

Sometimes, the Lie superalgebra is embedded within A in the sense that there is a homomorphism from the universal enveloping algebra of the Lie superalgebra to A. In that case, the equation above reduces to

L[a]=La-(-1)^{La}aL.

This approach avoids working directly with a Lie supergroup, and hence avoids the use of auxiliary Grassmann numbers.

== See also ==
- Graded vector space
- Lie algebra representation
- Representation theory of Hopf algebras
