= Supergeometry =

Differential geometry of supermanifolds

Supergeometry is differential geometry of modules over graded commutative algebras, supermanifolds and graded manifolds. Supergeometry is part and parcel of many classical and quantum field theories involving odd fields, e.g., SUSY field theory, BRST theory, or supergravity.

Supergeometry is formulated in terms of $\mathbb Z_2$-graded modules and sheaves over $\mathbb Z_2$-graded commutative algebras (supercommutative algebras). In particular, superconnections are defined as Koszul connections on these modules and sheaves. However, supergeometry is not particular noncommutative geometry because of a different definition of a graded derivation.

Graded manifolds and supermanifolds also are phrased in terms of sheaves of graded commutative algebras. Graded manifolds are characterized by sheaves on smooth manifolds, while supermanifolds are constructed by gluing of sheaves of supervector spaces. There are different types of supermanifolds. These are smooth supermanifolds ($H^\infty$-, $G^\infty$-, $GH^\infty$-supermanifolds), $G$-supermanifolds, and DeWitt supermanifolds. In particular, supervector bundles and principal superbundles are considered in the category of $G$-supermanifolds. Definitions of principal superbundles and principal superconnections straightforwardly follow that of smooth principal bundles and principal connections. Principal graded bundles also are considered in the category of graded manifolds.

There is a different class of Quillen–Ne'eman superbundles and superconnections. These superconnections have been applied to computing the Chern character in K-theory, noncommutative geometry, and BRST formalism.

== See also ==
- Supersymmetry
- Connection (algebraic framework)
- Supermetric
