= Gerstenhaber algebra =

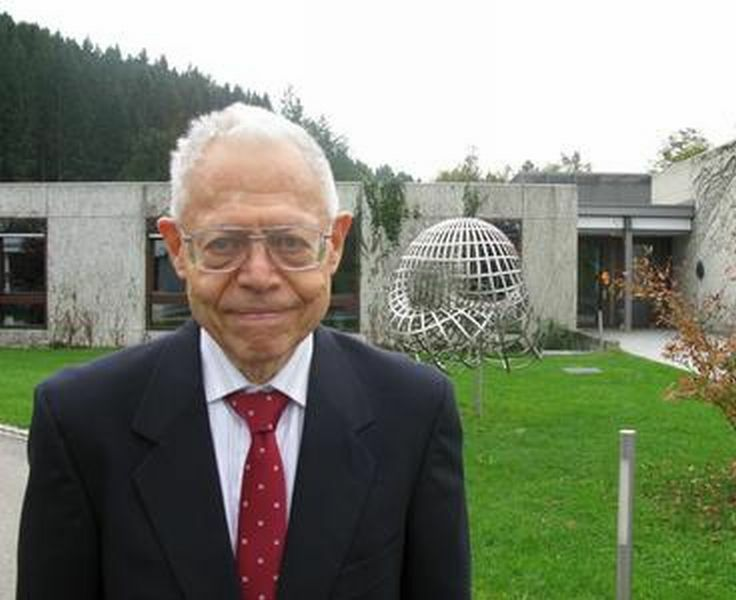
Murray Gerstenhaber at Oberwolfach in 2010

In mathematics and theoretical physics, a Gerstenhaber algebra (sometimes called an antibracket algebra or braid algebra) is an algebraic structure discovered by Murray Gerstenhaber (1963) that combines the structures of a supercommutative ring and a graded Lie superalgebra. It is used in the Batalin–Vilkovisky formalism. It appears also in the generalization of Hamiltonian formalism known as the De Donder–Weyl theory as the algebra of generalized Poisson brackets defined on differential forms.

== Definition ==
A Gerstenhaber algebra is a graded-commutative algebra with a Lie bracket of degree −1 satisfying the Poisson identity. Everything is understood to satisfy the usual superalgebra sign conventions. More precisely, the algebra has two products, one written as ordinary multiplication and one written as [,], and a Z-grading called degree (in theoretical physics sometimes called ghost number). The degree of an element a is denoted by |a|. These satisfy the identities

- (ab)c = a(bc) (The product is associative)
- ab = (−1)^{|a||b|}ba (The product is (super) commutative)
- |ab| = |a| + |b| (The product has degree 0)
- |[a,b]| = |a| + |b| − 1 (The Lie bracket has degree −1)
- [a,bc] = [a,b]c + (−1)^{(|a|−1)|b|}b[a,c] (Poisson identity)
- [a,b] = −(−1)^{(|a|−1)(|b|−1)} [b,a] (Antisymmetry of Lie bracket)
- [a,[b,c]] = [[a,b],c] + (−1)^{(|a|−1)(|b|−1)}[b,[a,c]] (The Jacobi identity for the Lie bracket)

Gerstenhaber algebras differ from Poisson superalgebras in that the Lie bracket has degree −1 rather than degree 0. The Jacobi identity may also be expressed in a symmetrical form

$$(-1)^{(|a|-1)(|c|-1)}[a,[b,c]]+(-1)^{(|b|-1)(|a|-1)}[b,[c,a]]+(-1)^{(|c|-1)(|b|-1)}[c,[a,b]] = 0.\,$$

== Examples ==
- Gerstenhaber showed that the Hochschild cohomology H^{*}(A,A) of an algebra A is a Gerstenhaber algebra.
- A Batalin–Vilkovisky algebra has an underlying Gerstenhaber algebra if one forgets its second order Δ operator.
- The exterior algebra of a Lie algebra is a Gerstenhaber algebra.
- The differential forms on a Poisson manifold form a Gerstenhaber algebra.
- The multivector fields on a manifold form a Gerstenhaber algebra using the Schouten–Nijenhuis bracket
