= Felix Berezin =

Russian mathematician

- Born: 25 April 1931; Moscow
- Died: 14 July 1980 (aged 49) in the region of Kolyma
- Education: Moscow State University
- Known for: Berezinian; Berezin formula Berezin integral Berezin transform Berezin–Harish–Chandra formula Supermathematics
- Scientific career
- Fields: Mathematics; Theoretical physics
- Workplaces: Moscow State University
- Doctoral advisor: Israel Gelfand
- Doctoral students: Anatoly Stepin

Felix Alexandrovich Berezin (Russian: Фе́ликс Алекса́ндрович Бере́зин; 25 April 1931 – 14 July 1980) was a Soviet Russian mathematician and physicist known for his contributions to the theory of supersymmetry and supermanifolds as well as to the path integral formulation of quantum field theory.

Berezin studied at the Moscow State University, but was not allowed to do his graduate studies there on account of his Jewish origin (his mother was Jewish). For the next three years Berezin taught at Moscow high schools. He continued to study mathematical physics under direction of Israel Gelfand. After Khrushchev's liberalization, he joined the Department of Mathematics at the Moscow State University at the age of 25.

The Berezin integral over anticommuting Grassmann variables is named for him, as is the closely related construction of the Berezinian which may be regarded as the "super"-analog of the determinant.

Berezin drowned during a summer trip in the region of Kolyma.

== Works ==
- The Method of Second Quantization, Academic Press (1966).
- Introduction to Superanalysis, Springer (1987).

== See also ==
- Oscillator representation
