= Berezin transform =

In mathematics — specifically, in complex analysis — the Berezin transform is an integral operator acting on functions defined on the open unit disk D of the complex plane C. Formally, for a function ƒ : D → C, the Berezin transform of ƒ is a new function Bƒ : D → C defined at a point z ∈ D by

$$(B f)(z) = \int_D \frac{(1 - |z|^2)^2}{| 1 - z \bar{w} |^4} f(w) \, \mathrm{d}A (w),$$

where w̅ denotes the complex conjugate of w and $\mathrm{d}A$ is the area measure. It is named after Felix Alexandrovich Berezin.
