= Marjorie Batchelor =

American mathematician

Marjorie Blake (Marj) Batchelor-Winter is an American mathematician known for her work on coalgebras and supermanifolds. She is an emeritus staff member in the department of pure mathematics and mathematical statistics at the University of Cambridge in England, where she was formerly the graduate education officer and director of the Cambridge Mathematics Placements summer programme.

== Education ==
Batchelor is the daughter of William Henry Batchelor, a medical researcher and administrator at the National Institutes of Health. She graduated from Smith College in 1973, and in 2008 returned to Smith with her husband, Alan Winter, to help revive the tradition of change ringing at Smith.

She became a student of Bertram Kostant at the Massachusetts Institute of Technology, completing her Ph.D. there in 1978 with a dissertation on The Structure of Supermanifolds.

== Research ==
In the theory of supermanifolds, Batchelor's theorem states that every supermanifold can be realized as a sheaf of differential forms over the exterior bundle of a vector bundle. Batchelor published its proof in her 1979 paper, "The structure of supermanifolds".

== Activism ==
At Cambridge, Batchelor became known for her efforts to encourage women in mathematics, and to build a more collegial and interactive atmosphere among the students studying for the Mathematical Tripos.
