= Associator =

Mathematical operation

In abstract algebra, the term associator is used in different ways as a measure of the non-associativity of an algebraic structure. Associators are commonly studied as triple systems.

== Ring theory ==
For a non-associative ring or algebra R, the associator is the multilinear map $[\cdot,\cdot,\cdot] : R \times R \times R \to R$ given by

$$[x,y,z] = (xy)z - x(yz).$$

Just as the commutator

$$[x, y] = xy - yx$$

measures the degree of non-commutativity, the associator measures the degree of non-associativity of R. For an associative ring or algebra the associator is identically zero.

The associator in any ring obeys the identity

$$w[x,y,z] + [w,x,y]z = [wx,y,z] - [w,xy,z] + [w,x,yz].$$

The associator is alternating precisely when R is an alternative ring.

The associator is symmetric in its two rightmost arguments when R is a pre-Lie algebra.

The nucleus is the set of elements that associate with all others: that is, the n in R such that

$$[n,R,R] = [R,n,R] = [R,R,n] = \{0\} \ .$$

The nucleus is an associative subring of R.

== Quasigroup theory ==
A quasigroup Q is a set with a binary operation $\cdot : Q \times Q \to Q$ such that for each a, b in Q, the equations $a \cdot x = b$ and $y \cdot a = b$ have unique solutions x, y in Q. In a quasigroup Q, the associator is the map $(\cdot,\cdot,\cdot) : Q \times Q \times Q \to Q$ defined by the equation

$$(a\cdot b)\cdot c = (a\cdot (b\cdot c))\cdot (a,b,c)$$

for all a, b, c in Q. As with its ring theory analog, the quasigroup associator is a measure of nonassociativity of Q.

== Higher-dimensional algebra ==
In higher-dimensional algebra, where there may be non-identity morphisms between algebraic expressions, an associator is an isomorphism

$$a_{x,y,z} : (xy)z \mapsto x(yz).$$

== Category theory ==
In category theory, the associator expresses the associative properties of the internal product functor in monoidal categories.

== See also ==
- Commutator
- Non-associative algebra
- Quasi-bialgebra – discusses the Drinfeld associator
