= Supermetric =

Supermetric is a mathematical concept used in a number of fields in physics.

== See also ==
- Supergeometry
- Supergravity
- Super Minkowski space
- Gauge gravitation theory
