= Supermodule =

In mathematics, a supermodule is a Z_{2}-graded module over a superring or superalgebra. Supermodules arise in super linear algebra which is a mathematical framework for studying the concept supersymmetry in theoretical physics.

Supermodules over a commutative superalgebra can be viewed as generalizations of super vector spaces over a (purely even) field K. Supermodules often play a more prominent role in super linear algebra than do super vector spaces. These reason is that it is often necessary or useful to extend the field of scalars to include odd variables. In doing so one moves from fields to commutative superalgebras and from vector spaces to modules.

In this article, all superalgebras are assumed be associative and unital unless stated otherwise.

== Formal definition ==
Let A be a fixed superalgebra. A right supermodule over A is a right module E over A with a direct sum decomposition (as an abelian group)

$$E = E_0 \oplus E_1$$

such that multiplication by elements of A satisfies

$$E_i A_j \subseteq E_{i+j}$$

for all i and j in Z_{2}. The subgroups E_{i} are then right A_{0}-modules.

The elements of E_{i} are said to be homogeneous. The parity of a homogeneous element x, denoted by |x|, is 0 or 1 according to whether it is in E_{0} or E_{1}. Elements of parity 0 are said to be even and those of parity 1 to be odd. If a is a homogeneous scalar and x is a homogeneous element of E then |x·a| is homogeneous and |x·a| = |x| + |a|.

Likewise, left supermodules and superbimodules are defined as left modules or bimodules over A whose scalar multiplications respect the gradings in the obvious manner. If A is supercommutative, then every left or right supermodule over A may be regarded as a superbimodule by setting

$$a\cdot x = (-1)^{|a||x|}x\cdot a$$

for homogeneous elements a ∈ A and x ∈ E, and extending by linearity. If A is purely even this reduces to the ordinary definition.

== Homomorphisms ==
A homomorphism between supermodules is a module homomorphism that preserves the grading. Let E and F be right supermodules over A. A map

$$\phi : E \to F\,$$

is a supermodule homomorphism if

- $\phi(x+y) =\phi(x)+\phi(y)\,$
- $\phi(x\cdot a) = \phi(x)\cdot a\,$
- $\phi(E_i)\subseteq F_i\,$

for all a∈A and all x,y∈E. The set of all module homomorphisms from E to F is denoted by Hom(E, F).

In many cases, it is necessary or convenient to consider a larger class of morphisms between supermodules. Let A be a supercommutative algebra. Then all supermodules over A be regarded as superbimodules in a natural fashion. For supermodules E and F, let Hom(E, F) denote the space of all right A-linear maps (i.e. all module homomorphisms from E to F considered as ungraded right A-modules). There is a natural grading on Hom(E, F) where the even homomorphisms are those that preserve the grading

$$\phi(E_i)\subseteq F_i$$

and the odd homomorphisms are those that reverse the grading

$$\phi(E_i)\subseteq F_{1-i}.$$

If φ ∈ Hom(E, F) and a ∈ A are homogeneous then

$$\phi(x\cdot a) = \phi(x)\cdot a\qquad \phi(a\cdot x) = (-1)^{|a||\phi|}a\cdot\phi(x).$$

That is, the even homomorphisms are both right and left linear whereas the odd homomorphism are right linear but left antilinear (with respect to the grading automorphism).

The set Hom(E, F) can be given the structure of a bimodule over A by setting

$$\begin{align}(a\cdot\phi)(x) &= a\cdot\phi(x)\\
(\phi\cdot a)(x) &= \phi(a\cdot x).\end{align}$$

With the above grading Hom(E, F) becomes a supermodule over A whose even part is the set of all ordinary supermodule homomorphisms

$$\mathbf{Hom}_0(E,F) = \mathrm{Hom}(E,F).$$

In the language of category theory, the class of all supermodules over A forms a category with supermodule homomorphisms as the morphisms. This category is a symmetric monoidal closed category under the super tensor product whose internal Hom functor is given by Hom.
