= Supermanifold =

Supergeometric generalization of a manifold

In mathematics and mathematical physics, supermanifolds are generalizations of manifolds in which the algebra of functions includes both commuting and anticommuting variables. In the standard mathematical formulation, a smooth supermanifold is a locally ringed space whose structure sheaf is locally isomorphic to the tensor product of the ring of ordinary smooth functions $C^\infty(\mathbb R^p)$ and a Grassmann algebra $\Lambda(\xi_1,\dots,\xi_q)$ of the anticommuting variables. In complex-analytic and algebraic settings, smooth functions are replaced with holomorphic functions or algebraic functions, respectively. An ordinary manifold is recovered from a supermanifold as the corresponding reduced space of commuting variables, sometimes called the body or reduced manifold.

Supermanifolds provide the basic objects of supergeometry. They were introduced in connection with supersymmetry and are used in areas of mathematical physics such as quantum field theory and string theory, as well as in purely mathematical subjects including the theory of Lie superalgebras and supergroups. Alongside the standard locally ringed-space formulation, more concrete coordinate-based formalisms are also used, especially in the physics literature.

== Definition ==
The standard mathematical definition of a supermanifold is in terms of a locally ringed space. In this approach, a supermanifold is a space equipped with a sheaf of supercommutative algebras that is locally isomorphic to a superdomain.

A more concrete coordinate-based formalism, used especially in parts of the physics literature, describes supermanifolds by charts with values in the even and odd parts of a Grassmann algebra. The relationship between this formalism and the locally ringed-space definition requires some care, and is often clarified using the functor of points.

=== Algebro-geometric: as a locally ringed space ===
The standard mathematical definition of a smooth supermanifold is in terms of a locally ringed space. A smooth supermanifold of dimension $p|q$ is a locally ringed space $(|M|,\mathcal O_M)$ that is locally isomorphic to

$$\left(\mathbb R^p,\; C^\infty_{\mathbb R^p}\otimes \Lambda(\xi_1,\dots,\xi_q)\right).$$

More explicitly, every point of $|M|$ has an open neighbourhood $U$ such that $(U,\mathcal O_M|_U)$ is isomorphic to $(V, C^\infty_V\otimes\Lambda(\xi_1,\dots,\xi_q))$ for some open set $V\subseteq\mathbb R^p$.

The odd elements of the structure sheaf are nilpotent and anti-commute, so they do not define additional points of the underlying topological space. The underlying ordinary manifold $|M|$, sometimes called the reduced manifold or body, is obtained by quotienting $\mathcal O_M$ by the sheaf of ideals generated by its odd elements.

A morphism of supermanifolds is a morphism of locally ringed spaces respecting the $\mathbb Z_2$-grading. Variants of this definition are used in the smooth, complex-analytic, and algebraic categories. Historically, this approach is associated with the work of Felix Berezin, Dimitry Leites, and Bertram Kostant.

=== Concrete: as a smooth manifold ===
A different, more concrete approach describes a supermanifold in a way analogous to a smooth manifold, except that the model space $\mathbb{R}^p$ is replaced by a model superspace built from the even and odd parts of a Grassmann algebra.

To define this, one starts with a Grassmann algebra $\Lambda(V)$, where $V$ is an infinite-dimensional real or complex vector space. Its even and odd parts are denoted by $\Lambda(V)_{\bar 0}$ and $\Lambda(V)_{\bar 1}$. In the terminology used by DeWitt and Rogers, the even elements are called c-numbers and the odd elements a-numbers. One then writes

$$\mathbb{R}^p_c = (\Lambda(V)_{\bar 0})^p, \qquad \mathbb{R}^q_a = (\Lambda(V)_{\bar 1})^q,$$

and takes $\mathbb{R}^p_c\times\mathbb{R}^q_a$ as the local model superspace.

As in the case of an ordinary manifold, a supermanifold is then described by an atlas of charts with suitably smooth transition functions. In the DeWitt approach, these model superspaces are usually equipped with a coarse topology induced from the projection onto the underlying ordinary space $\mathbb{R}^p$.

This concrete approach is closely related to the locally ringed space definition, but the relationship requires some care. With suitable restrictions on transition functions, the two approaches are equivalent; more generally, the comparison is best understood using the functor of points.

== Properties ==
Unlike a regular manifold, a supermanifold is not entirely composed of a set of points. Instead, one takes the dual point of view that the structure of a supermanifold M is contained in its sheaf O_{M} of "smooth functions". In the dual point of view, an injective map corresponds to a surjection of sheaves, and a surjective map corresponds to an injection of sheaves.

An alternative approach to the dual point of view is to use the functor of points.

If M is a supermanifold of dimension (p,q), then the underlying space M inherits the structure of a differentiable manifold whose sheaf of smooth functions is $O_M/I$, where $I$ is the ideal generated by all odd functions. Thus M is called the underlying space, or the body, of M. The quotient map $O_M\to O_M/I$ corresponds to an injective map M → M; thus M is a submanifold of M.

== Tangent sheaf ==
The tangent sheaf of a supermanifold $M$ is the sheaf of graded derivations of its structure sheaf. Thus, for each open set $U$,
$$\mathcal T_M(U)=\operatorname{Der}_{\mathbb R}(\mathcal O_M(U)).$$
This is a locally free $\mathcal O_M$-module. The associated super vector bundle is called the tangent bundle of $M$. Its global sections are the vector fields on $M$.

An example is the supermanifold $\mathbb R^{1|1}$. The functions are $f_0(x) + \theta f_1(x)$ where $\theta$ is an odd generator, and $f_i$ are smooth functions on the base manifold. The vector fields then have the form $v_0(x,\theta)\partial_x + v_1(x,\theta)\partial_\theta$, where $v_i$ belong to the structure sheaf of $\mathbb R^{1|1}$, and $\partial_\theta$ is the odd derivation that extracts the coefficient of $\theta$.

== Super Riemann surfaces ==
A super Riemann surface is a complex supermanifold of dimension $1|1$ equipped with a superconformal structure: an odd rank $0|1$ sub-bundle $D\subset TM$ that is maximally non-integrable. Equivalently, the Lie superbracket induces an isomorphism $D\otimes D \cong TM/D$. In suitable local coordinates $(z,\theta)$, a local generator of $D$ can be chosen as
$$D_\theta=\partial_\theta+\theta\partial_z,$$
for which
$$D_\theta^2=\tfrac12\{D_\theta,D_\theta\}=\partial_z.$$

A basic example is the genus-zero super Riemann surface $\mathbb{CP}^{1|1}$. In homogeneous coordinates $u,v\mid\theta$, all of degree $1$, its superconformal structure may be described by the homogeneous 1-form
$$\varpi=u\,dv-v\,du-\theta\,d\theta,$$
whose kernel is the superconformal distribution. In the affine chart $u=1$, writing $z=v$, this becomes $dz-\theta\,d\theta$, whose kernel is generated by $\partial_\theta+\theta\partial_z$.

More generally, for a split super Riemann surface, the reduced space is an ordinary Riemann surface together with a spin structure, that is, a square root of its canonical bundle (equivalently, of its tangent bundle). (This is a definition of split super Riemann structures, although there are non-split examples where the superconformal structure does not come from a square root of the canonical bundle.)

Another example is a genus-one super Riemann surface with even spin structure, obtained as the quotient of $\mathbb C^{1|1}$ by
$$z\mapsto z+1,\ \theta\mapsto\theta,\qquad z\mapsto z+\tau,\ \theta\mapsto -\theta,$$
where $\tau$ lies in the upper half-plane. (The other possible twists correspond to the four different theta characteristics in genus 1.)

== Projective spaces ==
The projective superspace $\mathbb{CP}^{p|q}$ is defined as a quotient of the affine superspace $\mathbb C^{p+1|q}$. The affine superspace $\mathbb C^{p+1|q}$ has structure sheaf $\mathcal O_{\mathbb C^{p+1}}\otimes \Lambda(\theta_1,\dots,\theta_q)$, and one can think of the projective space roughly as the quoient of the action of even invertible $\lambda$, $(z,\theta)\sim (\lambda z,\lambda\theta)$.

More precisely, $\mathbb{CP}^{p|q}$ is obtained by the proj construction for the $\mathbb Z$-grading on the affine coordinate ring $\mathbb C[x_1,\dots,x_{p+1}|\theta_1,\dots,\theta_q]$. The localization in the affine patch $D(x_i)$ is
$$\mathcal O(D(x_i)) = (\mathbb C[x_1,\dots,\hat x_i,\dots,x_{p+1}|\theta_1,\dots,\theta_q][x_i^{-1}])_0.$$
The transition functions are the obvious ones.

== Examples ==
- Let M be a manifold. The odd tangent bundle ΠTM is a supermanifold given by the sheaf Ω(M) of differential forms on M.
- More generally, let E → M be a vector bundle. Then ΠE is a supermanifold given by the sheaf Γ(ΛE^{*}). In fact, Π is a functor from the category of vector bundles to the category of supermanifolds.
- Lie supergroups are examples of supermanifolds.

== Batchelor's theorem ==
Batchelor's theorem states that every supermanifold is noncanonically isomorphic to a supermanifold of the form ΠE. The word "noncanonically" prevents one from concluding that supermanifolds are simply glorified vector bundles; although the functor Π maps surjectively onto the isomorphism classes of supermanifolds, it is not an equivalence of categories. It was published by Marjorie Batchelor in 1979.

The proof of Batchelor's theorem relies in an essential way on the existence of a partition of unity, so it does not hold for complex or real-analytic supermanifolds.

== Odd symplectic structures ==
=== Odd symplectic form ===
In many physical and geometric applications, a supermanifold comes equipped with an Grassmann-odd symplectic structure. All natural geometric objects on a supermanifold are graded. In particular, the bundle of two-forms is equipped with a grading. An odd symplectic form ω on a supermanifold is a closed, odd form, inducing a non-degenerate pairing on TM. Such a supermanifold is called a P-manifold. Its graded dimension is necessarily (n,n), because the odd symplectic form induces a pairing of odd and even variables. There is a version of the Darboux theorem for P-manifolds, which allows one to equip a P-manifold locally with a set of coordinates where the odd symplectic form ω is written as

$$\omega = \sum_{i}  d\xi_i \wedge dx_i ,$$

where $x_i$ are even coordinates, and $\xi_i$ odd coordinates. (An odd symplectic form should not be confused with a Grassmann-even symplectic form on a supermanifold. In contrast, the Darboux version of an even symplectic form is

$$\sum_i dp_i \wedge dq_i+\sum_j \frac{\varepsilon_j}{2}(d\xi_j)^2,$$

where $p_i,q_i$ are even coordinates, $\xi_i$ odd coordinates and $\varepsilon_j$ are either +1 or −1.)

=== Antibracket ===
Given an odd symplectic 2-form ω one may define a Poisson bracket known as the antibracket of any two functions F and G on a supermanifold by

$$\{F,G\}=\frac{\partial_rF}{\partial z^i}\omega^{ij}(z)\frac{\partial_lG}{\partial z^j}.$$

Here $\partial_r$ and $\partial_l$ are the right and left derivatives respectively and z are the coordinates of the supermanifold. Equipped with this bracket, the algebra of functions on a supermanifold becomes an antibracket algebra.

A coordinate transformation that preserves the antibracket is called a P-transformation. If the Berezinian of a P-transformation is equal to one then it is called an SP-transformation.

=== P and SP-manifolds ===
Using the Darboux theorem for odd symplectic forms one can show that P-manifolds are constructed from open sets of superspaces ${\mathcal{R}}^{n|n}$ glued together by P-transformations. A manifold is said to be an SP-manifold if these transition functions can be chosen to be SP-transformations. Equivalently one may define an SP-manifold as a supermanifold with a nondegenerate odd 2-form ω and a density function ρ such that on each coordinate patch there exist Darboux coordinates in which ρ is identically equal to one.

=== Laplacian ===
One may define a Laplacian operator Δ on an SP-manifold as the operator which takes a function H to one half of the divergence of the corresponding Hamiltonian vector field. Explicitly one defines

$$\Delta H=\frac{1}{2\rho}\frac{\partial_r}{\partial z^a}\left(\rho\omega^{ij}(z)\frac{\partial_l H}{\partial z^j}\right).$$

In Darboux coordinates this definition reduces to

$$\Delta=\frac{\partial_r}{\partial x^a}\frac{\partial_l}{\partial \theta_a}$$

where x^{a} and θ_{a} are even and odd coordinates such that

$$\omega=dx^a\wedge d\theta_a.$$

The Laplacian is odd and nilpotent

$$\Delta^2=0.$$

One may define the cohomology of functions H with respect to the Laplacian. In Geometry of Batalin-Vilkovisky quantization, Albert Schwarz has proven that the integral of a function H over a Lagrangian submanifold L depends only on the cohomology class of H and on the homology class of the body of L in the body of the ambient supermanifold.

== SUSY ==
A pre-SUSY-structure on a supermanifold of dimension (n,m) is an odd m-dimensional distribution $P \subset TM$. With such a distribution one associates its Frobenius tensor $S^2 P \mapsto TM/P$ (since P is odd, the skew-symmetric Frobenius tensor is a symmetric operation). If this tensor is non-degenerate, e.g. lies in an open orbit of $GL(P) \times GL(TM/P)$, M is called a SUSY-manifold. SUSY-structure in dimension (1, k) is the same as odd contact structure.

== See also ==
- Superspace
- Supersymmetry
- Supergeometry
- Graded manifold
- Batalin–Vilkovisky formalism
