= Commutator =

Operation measuring the failure of two entities to commute

In mathematics, the commutator gives an indication of the extent to which a certain binary operation fails to be commutative. There are different definitions used in group theory and ring theory.

== Group theory ==
The commutator of two elements, g and h, of a group G, is the element

[g, h] = g^{−1}h^{−1}gh.

This element is equal to the group's identity if and only if g and h commute (that is, if and only if gh = hg).

The set of all commutators of a group is not in general closed under the group operation, but the subgroup of G generated by all commutators is closed and is called the derived group or the commutator subgroup of G. Commutators are used to define nilpotent and solvable groups and the largest abelian quotient group.

The definition of the commutator above is used throughout this article, but many group theorists define the commutator as

[g, h] = ghg^{−1}h^{−1}.

Using the first definition, this can be expressed as [g^{−1}, h^{−1}].

=== Identities (group theory) ===
Commutator identities are an important tool in group theory. The expression a^{x} denotes the conjugate of a by x, defined as x^{−1}ax.

1. $x^y = x[x, y].$
2. $[y, x] = [x,y]^{-1}.$
3. $[x, zy] = [x, y]\cdot [x, z]^y$ and $[x z, y] = [x, y]^z \cdot [z, y].$
4. $\left[x, y^{-1}\right] = [y, x]^{y^{-1}}$ and $\left[x^{-1}, y\right] = [y, x]^{x^{-1}}.$
5. $\left[\left[x, y^{-1}\right], z\right]^y \cdot \left[\left[y, z^{-1}\right], x\right]^z \cdot \left[\left[z, x^{-1}\right], y\right]^x = 1$ and $\left[\left[x, y\right], z^x\right] \cdot \left[[z ,x], y^z\right] \cdot \left[[y, z], x^y\right] = 1.$

Identity (5) is also known as the Hall–Witt identity, after Philip Hall and Ernst Witt. It is a group-theoretic analogue of the Jacobi identity for the ring-theoretic commutator (see next section).

N.B., the above definition of the conjugate of a by x is used by some group theorists. Many other group theorists define the conjugate of a by x as xax^{−1}. This is often written ${}^x a$. Similar identities hold for these conventions.

Many identities that are true modulo certain subgroups are also used. These can be particularly useful in the study of solvable groups and nilpotent groups. For instance, in any group, second powers behave well:

$$(xy)^2 = x^2 y^2 [y, x][[y, x], y].$$

If the derived subgroup is central, then

$$(xy)^n = x^n y^n [y, x]^\binom{n}{2}.$$

== Ring theory ==
Rings often do not support division. Thus, the commutator of two elements a and b of a ring (or any associative algebra) is defined differently by

$$[a, b] = ab - ba.$$

The commutator is zero if and only if a and b commute. In linear algebra, if two endomorphisms of a space are represented by commuting matrices in terms of one basis, then they are so represented in terms of every basis. By using the commutator as a Lie bracket, every associative algebra can be turned into a Lie algebra.

The anticommutator of two elements a and b of a ring or associative algebra is defined by

$$\{a, b\} = ab + ba.$$

Sometimes $[a,b]_+$ is used to denote anticommutator, while $[a,b]_-$ is then used for commutator. The anticommutator is used less often, but can be used to define Clifford algebras and Jordan algebras and in the derivation of the Dirac equation in particle physics.

The commutator of two operators acting on a Hilbert space is a central concept in quantum mechanics, since it quantifies how well the two observables described by these operators can be measured simultaneously. The uncertainty principle is ultimately a theorem about such commutators, by virtue of the Robertson–Schrödinger relation. In phase space, equivalent commutators of function star-products are called Moyal brackets and are completely isomorphic to the Hilbert space commutator structures mentioned.

=== Identities (ring theory) ===
The commutator has the following properties:

==== Lie-algebra identities ====
1. $[A + B, C] = [A, C] + [B, C]$
2. $[A, A] = 0$
3. $[A, B] = -[B, A]$
4. $[A, [B, C]] + [B, [C, A]] + [C, [A, B]] = 0$

Relation (3) is called anticommutativity, while (4) is the Jacobi identity.

==== Additional identities ====
1. $[A, BC] = [A, B]C + B[A, C]$
2. $[A, BCD] = [A, B]CD + B[A, C]D + BC[A, D]$
3. $[A, BCDE] = [A, B]CDE + B[A, C]DE + BC[A, D]E + BCD[A, E]$
4. $[AB, C] = A[B, C] + [A, C]B$
5. $[ABC, D] = AB[C, D] + A[B, D]C + [A, D]BC$
6. $[ABCD, E] = ABC[D, E] + AB[C, E]D + A[B, E]CD + [A, E]BCD$
7. $[A, B + C] = [A, B] + [A, C]$
8. $[A + B, C + D] = [A, C] + [A, D] + [B, C] + [B, D]$
9. $[AB, CD] = A[B, C]D + [A, C]BD + CA[B, D] + C[A, D]B =A[B, C]D + AC[B,D] + [A,C]DB + C[A, D]B$
10. $[[A, C], [B, D]] = [[[A, B], C], D] + [[[B, C], D], A] + [[[C, D], A], B] + [[[D, A], B], C]$

If A is a fixed element of a ring R, identity (1) can be interpreted as a Leibniz rule for the map $\operatorname{ad}_A: R \rightarrow R$ given by $\operatorname{ad}_A(B) = [A, B]$. In other words, the map ad_{A} defines a derivation on the ring R. Identities (2), (3) represent Leibniz rules for more than two factors, and are valid for any derivation. Identities (4)–(6) can also be interpreted as Leibniz rules. Identities (7), (8) express Z-bilinearity.

From identity (9), one finds that the commutator of integer powers of ring elements is:

$$[A^N, B^M] = \sum_{n=0}^{N-1}\sum_{m=0}^{M-1} A^{n}B^{m} [A,B] B^{M-m-1}A^{N-n-1} = \sum_{n=0}^{N-1}\sum_{m=0}^{M-1} B^{m}A^{n} [A,B] A^{N-n-1}B^{M-m-1}$$

Some of the above identities can be extended to the anticommutator using the above ± subscript notation. For example:

1. $[AB, C]_\pm = A[B, C]_- + [A, C]_\pm B$
2. $[AB, CD]_\pm = A[B, C]_- D + AC[B, D]_- + [A, C]_- DB + C[A, D]_\pm B$
3. $[[A,B],[C,D]]=[[[B,C]_+,A]_+,D]-[[[B,D]_+,A]_+,C]+[[[A,D]_+,B]_+,C]-[[[A,C]_+,B]_+,D]$
4. $\left[A, [B, C]_\pm\right] + \left[B, [C, A]_\pm\right] + \left[C, [A, B]_\pm\right] = 0$
5. $[A,BC]_\pm = [A,B]_- C + B[A,C]_\pm = [A,B]_\pm C \mp B[A,C]_-$
6. $[A,BC] = [A,B]_\pm C \mp B[A,C]_\pm$

==== Exponential identities ====
Consider a ring or algebra in which the exponential $e^A = \exp(A) = 1 + A + \tfrac{1}{2!}A^2 + \cdots$ can be meaningfully defined, such as a Banach algebra or a ring of formal power series.

In such a ring, Hadamard's lemma applied to nested commutators gives: $e^A Be^{-A} \ =\ B + [A, B] + \frac{1}{2!}[A, [A, B]] + \frac{1}{3!}[A, [A, [A, B]]] + \cdots \ =\ e^{\operatorname{ad}_A}(B).$ (For the last expression, see Adjoint derivation below.) This formula underlies the Baker–Campbell–Hausdorff expansion of log(exp(A) exp(B)).

A similar expansion expresses the group commutator of expressions $e^A$ (analogous to elements of a Lie group) in terms of a series of nested commutators (Lie brackets),
$$e^A e^B e^{-A} e^{-B} =
\exp\!\left(  [A, B] + \frac{1}{2!}[A{+}B, [A, B]] + \frac{1}{3!} \left(\frac{1}{2} [A, [B, [B, A]]] + [A{+}B, [A{+}B, [A, B]]]\right) + \cdots\right).$$

== Graded rings and algebras ==
When dealing with graded algebras, the commutator is usually replaced by the graded commutator, defined in homogeneous components as

$$[\omega, \eta]_{gr} := \omega\eta - (-1)^{\deg \omega \deg \eta} \eta\omega.$$

== Adjoint derivation ==
Especially if one deals with multiple commutators in a ring R, another notation turns out to be useful. For an element $x\in R$, we define the adjoint mapping $\mathrm{ad}_x:R\to R$ by:

$$\operatorname{ad}_x(y) = [x, y] = xy-yx.$$

This mapping is a derivation on the ring R:

$$\mathrm{ad}_x\!(yz) \ =\ \mathrm{ad}_x\!(y) \,z \,+\, y\,\mathrm{ad}_x\!(z).$$

By the Jacobi identity, it is also a derivation over the commutation operation:

$$\mathrm{ad}_x[y,z] \ =\ [\mathrm{ad}_x\!(y),z] \,+\, [y,\mathrm{ad}_x\!(z)] .$$

Composing such mappings, we get for example $\operatorname{ad}_x\operatorname{ad}_y(z) = [x, [y, z]\,]$ and
$$\operatorname{ad}_x^2\!(z) \ =\
\operatorname{ad}_x\!(\operatorname{ad}_x\!(z)) \ =\
[x, [x, z]\,].$$
We may consider $\mathrm{ad}$ itself as a mapping, $\mathrm{ad}: R \to \mathrm{End}(R)$, where $\mathrm{End}(R)$ is the ring of mappings from R to itself with composition as the multiplication operation. Then $\mathrm{ad}$ is a Lie algebra homomorphism, preserving the commutator:

$$\operatorname{ad}_{[x, y]} = \left[ \operatorname{ad}_x, \operatorname{ad}_y \right].$$

By contrast, it is not always a ring homomorphism: usually $\operatorname{ad}_{xy} \,\neq\, \operatorname{ad}_x\operatorname{ad}_y$.

=== General Leibniz rule ===
The general Leibniz rule, expanding repeated derivatives of a product, can be written abstractly using the adjoint representation:

$$x^n y = \sum_{k = 0}^n \binom{n}{k} \operatorname{ad}_x^k\!(y)\, x^{n - k}.$$

Replacing $x$ by the differentiation operator $\partial$, and $y$ by the multiplication operator $m_f : g \mapsto fg$, we get $\operatorname{ad}(\partial)(m_f) = m_{\partial(f)}$, and applying both sides to a function g, the identity becomes the usual Leibniz rule for the nth derivative $\partial^{n}\!(fg)$.

== See also ==
- Anticommutativity
- Associator
- Baker–Campbell–Hausdorff formula
- Canonical commutation relation
- Centralizer a.k.a. commutant
- Derivation (abstract algebra)
- Moyal bracket
- Pincherle derivative
- Poisson bracket
- Ternary commutator
- Three subgroups lemma
