= Super vector space =

Graded vector space with applications to theoretical physics

In mathematics, a super vector space is a $\mathbb Z_2$-graded vector space, that is, a vector space over a field $\mathbb K$ with a given decomposition of subspaces of grade $0$ and grade $1$. The study of super vector spaces and their generalizations is sometimes called super linear algebra. These objects find their principal application in theoretical physics where they are used to describe the various algebraic aspects of supersymmetry.

== Definitions ==
A super vector space is a $\mathbb Z_2$-graded vector space with decomposition

$$V = V_0\oplus V_1,\quad 0, 1 \in \mathbb Z_2 = \mathbb Z/2\mathbb Z.$$

Vectors that are elements of either $V_0$ or $V_1$ are said to be homogeneous. The parity of a nonzero homogeneous element, denoted by $|x|$, is $0$ or $1$ according to whether it is in $V_0$ or $V_1$,

$$|x| = \begin{cases}0 & x\in V_0\\1 & x\in V_1\end{cases}$$

Vectors of parity $0$ are called even and those of parity $1$ are called odd. In theoretical physics, the even elements are sometimes called Bose elements or bosonic, and the odd elements Fermi elements or fermionic. Definitions for super vector spaces are often given only in terms of homogeneous elements and then extended to nonhomogeneous elements by linearity.

If $V$ is finite-dimensional and the dimensions of $V_0$ and $V_1$ are $p$ and $q$ respectively, then $V$ is said to have dimension $p|q$. The standard super coordinate space, denoted $\mathbb K^{p|q}$, is the ordinary coordinate space $\mathbb K^{p+q}$ where the even subspace is spanned by the first $p$ coordinate basis vectors and the odd space is spanned by the last $q$.

A homogeneous subspace of a super vector space is a linear subspace that is spanned by homogeneous elements. Homogeneous subspaces are super vector spaces in their own right (with the obvious grading).

For any super vector space $V$, one can define the parity reversed space $\Pi V$ to be the super vector space with the even and odd subspaces interchanged. That is,

$$\begin{align}
(\Pi V)_0 &= V_1, \\
(\Pi V)_1 &= V_0.\end{align}$$

== Linear transformations ==
A homomorphism, a morphism in the category of super vector spaces, from one super vector space to another is a grade-preserving linear transformation. A linear transformation $f : V \rightarrow W$ between super vector spaces is grade preserving if

$$f(V_i) \sub W_{i}, \quad i = 0, 1.$$

That is, it maps the even elements of $V$ to even elements of $W$ and odd elements of $V$ to odd elements of $W$. An isomorphism of super vector spaces is a bijective homomorphism. The set of all homomorphisms $V \rightarrow W$ is denoted $\mathrm{Hom}(V, W)$.

Every linear transformation, not necessarily grade-preserving, from one super vector space to another can be written uniquely as the sum of a grade-preserving transformation and a grade-reversing one—that is, a transformation $f : V \rightarrow W$ such that

$$f(V_i) \sub W_{1-i}, \quad i = 0, 1.$$

Declaring the grade-preserving transformations to be even and the grade-reversing ones to be odd gives the space of all linear transformations from $V$ to $W$, denoted $\mathbf{Hom}(V, W)$ and called internal $\mathrm{Hom}$, the structure of a super vector space. In particular,

$$\left(\mathbf{Hom}(V, W)\right)_0 = \mathrm{Hom}(V, W).$$

A grade-reversing transformation from $V$ to $W$ can be regarded as a homomorphism from $V$ to the parity reversed space $\Pi W$, so that

$$\mathbf{Hom}(V, W) = \mathrm{Hom}(V, W) \oplus \mathrm{Hom}( V, \Pi W) = \mathrm{Hom}(V, W) \oplus \mathrm{Hom}( \Pi V, W) .$$

== Operations on super vector spaces ==
The usual algebraic constructions for ordinary vector spaces have their counterpart in the super vector space setting.

=== Dual space ===
The dual space $V^*$ of a super vector space $V$ can be regarded as a super vector space by taking the even functionals to be those that vanish on $V_1$ and the odd functionals to be those that vanish on $V_0$. Equivalently, one can define $V^*$ to be the space of linear maps from $V$ to $\mathbb K^{1|0}$ (the base field $\mathbb K$ thought of as a purely even super vector space) with the gradation given in the previous section.

=== Direct sum ===
Direct sums of super vector spaces are constructed as in the ungraded case with the grading given by

$$(V\oplus W)_0 = V_0\oplus W_0,$$
$$(V\oplus W)_1 = V_1\oplus W_1.$$

=== Tensor product ===
One can also construct tensor products of super vector spaces. Here the additive structure of $\mathbb Z_2$ comes into play. The underlying space is as in the ungraded case with the grading given by

$$(V\otimes W)_i = \bigoplus_{j+k=i}V_j\otimes W_k,$$

where the indices are in $\mathbb Z_2$. Specifically, one has

$$(V\otimes W)_0 = (V_0\otimes W_0)\oplus(V_1\otimes W_1),$$
$$(V\otimes W)_1 = (V_0\otimes W_1)\oplus(V_1\otimes W_0).$$

== Supermodules ==
Just as one may generalize vector spaces over a field to modules over a commutative ring, one may generalize super vector spaces over a field to supermodules over a supercommutative algebra (or ring).

A common construction when working with super vector spaces is to enlarge the field of scalars to a supercommutative Grassmann algebra. Given a field $\mathbb K$ let

$$R = \mathbb{K} [\theta_1, \cdots, \theta_N]$$

denote the Grassmann algebra generated by $N$ anticommuting odd elements $\theta_i$. Any super vector $V$ space over $\mathbb K$ can be embedded in a module over $R$ by considering the (graded) tensor product

$$\mathbb{K}[\theta_1, \cdots, \theta_N]\otimes V.$$

== The category of super vector spaces ==
The category of super vector spaces, denoted by $\mathbb K-\mathrm{SVect}$, is the category whose objects are super vector spaces (over a fixed field $\mathbb K$) and whose morphisms are even linear transformations (i.e. the grade preserving ones).

The categorical approach to super linear algebra is to first formulate definitions and theorems regarding ordinary (ungraded) algebraic objects in the language of category theory and then transfer these directly to the category of super vector spaces. This leads to a treatment of "superobjects" such as superalgebras, Lie superalgebras, supergroups, etc. that is completely analogous to their ungraded counterparts.

The category $\mathbb K-\mathrm{SVect}$ is a monoidal category with the super tensor product as the monoidal product and the purely even super vector space $\mathbb K^{1|0}$ as the unit object. The involutive braiding operator

$$\tau_{V,W}: V\otimes W \rightarrow W\otimes V,$$

given by

$$\tau_{V,W}(x\otimes y)=(-1)^{|x||y|}y \otimes x$$

on homogeneous elements, turns $\mathbb K-\mathrm{SVect}$ into a symmetric monoidal category. This commutativity isomorphism encodes the "rule of signs" that is essential to super linear algebra. It effectively says that a minus sign is picked up whenever two odd elements are interchanged. One need not worry about signs in the categorical setting as long as the above operator is used wherever appropriate.

$\mathbb K-\mathrm{SVect}$ is also a closed monoidal category with the internal Hom object, $\mathbf{Hom}(V, W)$, given by the super vector space of all linear maps from $V$ to $W$. The ordinary $\mathrm{Hom}$ set $\mathrm{Hom}(V, W)$ is the even subspace therein:

$$\mathrm{Hom}(V, W) = \mathbf{Hom}(V,W)_0.$$

The fact that $\mathbb K-\mathrm{SVect}$ is closed means that the functor $-\otimes V$ is left adjoint to the functor $\mathrm{Hom}(V, -)$, given a natural bijection

$$\mathrm{Hom}(U\otimes V, W) \cong \mathrm{Hom}(U,\mathbf{Hom}(V,W)).$$

== Superalgebra ==
A superalgebra over $\mathbb K$ can be described as a super vector space $\mathcal A$ with a multiplication map

$$\mu : \mathcal A \otimes \mathcal A \to \mathcal A,$$

that is a super vector space homomorphism. This is equivalent to demanding

$$|ab| = |a| + |b|, \quad a,b \in \mathcal A$$

Associativity and the existence of an identity can be expressed with the usual commutative diagrams, so that a unital associative superalgebra over $\mathbb K$ is a monoid in the category $\mathbb K-\mathrm{SVect}$.
