= Superalgebra =

Algebraic structure used in theoretical physics

In mathematics and theoretical physics, a superalgebra is a $\mathbb{Z}_2$-graded algebra. That is, it is an algebra over a commutative ring or field with a decomposition into "even" and "odd" pieces and a multiplication operator that respects the grading.

The prefix super- comes from the theory of supersymmetry in theoretical physics. Superalgebras and their representations, supermodules, provide an algebraic framework for formulating supersymmetry. The study of such objects is sometimes called super linear algebra. Superalgebras also play an important role in related field of supergeometry where they enter into the definitions of graded manifolds, supermanifolds and superschemes.

== Formal definition ==
Let $K$ be a commutative ring. In most applications, $K$ is a field of characteristic 0, such as $\mathbb{R}$ or $\mathbb{C}$.

A superalgebra over $K$ is a $K$-module $A$ with a direct sum decomposition

$$A = A_0\oplus A_1$$

together with a bilinear multiplication $A\times A\to A$ such that

$$A_iA_j \sube A_{i+j}$$

where the subscripts are read modulo 2, i.e. they are thought of as elements of $\mathbb{Z}_2$.

A superring, or $\mathbb{Z}_2$-graded ring, is a superalgebra over the ring of integers $\mathbb{Z}$.

The elements of each of the $A_i$ are said to be homogeneous. The parity of a homogeneous element $x$, denoted by $|x|$, is 0 or 1 according to whether it is in $A_0$ or $A_1$. Elements of parity 0 are said to be even and those of parity 1 to be odd. If $x$ and $y$ are both homogeneous, then so is the product $xy$ and $|xy| = |x| + |y|$.

An associative superalgebra is one whose multiplication is associative and a unital superalgebra is one with a multiplicative identity element. The identity element in a unital superalgebra is necessarily even. Unless otherwise specified, all superalgebras in this article are assumed to be associative and unital.

A commutative superalgebra (or supercommutative algebra) is one which satisfies a graded version of commutativity. Specifically, $A$ is commutative if

$$yx = (-1)^{|x||y|}xy\,$$

for all homogeneous elements $x$ and $y$ of $A$. There are superalgebras that are commutative in the ordinary sense, but not in the superalgebra sense. For this reason, commutative superalgebras are often called supercommutative in order to avoid confusion.

== Sign conventions ==
When the $\mathbb{Z}_2$ grading arises as a "rollup" of a $\mathbb{Z}$- or $\mathbb{N}$-graded algebra into even and odd components, then two distinct (but essentially equivalent) sign conventions can be found in the literature. These can be called the "cohomological sign convention" and the "super sign convention". They differ in how the antipode (exchange of two elements) behaves. In the first case, one has an exchange map

$$xy\mapsto (-1)^{mn+pq} yx$$

where $m=\deg x$ is the degree ($\mathbb{Z}$- or $\mathbb{N}$-grading) of $x$ and $p$ the parity. Likewise, $n=\deg y$ is the degree of $y$ and with parity $q.$ This convention is commonly seen in conventional mathematical settings, such as differential geometry and differential topology. The other convention is to take

$$xy\mapsto (-1)^{pq} yx$$

with the parities given as $p=m\bmod 2$ and $q=n\bmod 2$ the parity. This is more often seen in physics texts, and requires a parity functor to be judiciously employed to track isomorphisms. Detailed arguments are provided by Pierre Deligne.

== Examples ==
- Any algebra over a commutative ring $L$ may be regarded as a purely even superalgebra over $K$; that is, by taking $A_1$ to be the trivial algebra (the algebra with one element).
- Any $\mathbb{Z}$- or $\mathbb{N}$-graded algebra may be regarded as superalgebra by reading the grading modulo 2. This includes examples such as tensor algebras and polynomial rings over $K$.
- In particular, any exterior algebra over $K$ is a superalgebra. The exterior algebra is the standard example of a supercommutative algebra.
- The symmetric polynomials and alternating polynomials together form a superalgebra, being the even and odd parts, respectively. Note that this not obtained by "rollup" of the $\mathbb{N}$-graded algebra of polynomials, where the grading is by degrees.
- Clifford algebras are superalgebras. Clifford algebras for low-dimensional orthogonal spaces such as projective geometric algebra offer some visual intuition for superalgebras: odd elements correspond to handedness-reversing isometries of the space such as rotoreflections; even elements correspond to handedness-preserving ones such as rotations and screw motions.
- The set of all endomorphisms (denoted $\mathbf{End} (V) \equiv \mathbf{Hom}(V,V)$, where the boldface $\mathrm {Hom}$ is referred to as internal $\mathrm {Hom}$, composed of all linear maps) of a super vector space forms a superalgebra under composition.
- The set of all square supermatrices with entries in $K$ forms a superalgebra denoted by $M_{p|q}(K)$. This algebra may be identified with the algebra of endomorphisms of a free supermodule over $K$ of rank $p|q$ and is the internal Hom of above for this space.
- Lie superalgebras are a graded analog of Lie algebras. Lie superalgebras are nonunital and nonassociative; however, one may construct the analog of a universal enveloping algebra of a Lie superalgebra which is a unital, associative superalgebra.

== Further definitions and constructions ==
=== Even subalgebra ===
Let $A$ be a superalgebra over a commutative ring $K$. The submodule $A_0$, consisting of all even elements, is closed under multiplication and contains the identity of $A$ and therefore forms a subalgebra of $A$, naturally called the even subalgebra. It forms an ordinary algebra over $K$.

The set of all odd elements $A_1$ is an $A_0$-bimodule whose scalar multiplication is just multiplication in $A$. The product in $A$ equips $A_1$ with a bilinear form

$$\mu:A_1\otimes_{A_0}A_1 \to A_0$$

such that

$$\mu(x\otimes y)\cdot z = x\cdot\mu(y\otimes z)$$

for all $x$, $y$, and $z$ in $A_1$. This follows from the associativity of the product in $A$.

=== Grade involution ===
There is a canonical involutive automorphism on any superalgebra called the grade involution. It is given on homogeneous elements by

$$\hat x = (-1)^{|x|}x$$

and on arbitrary elements by

$$\hat x = x_0 - x_1$$

where $x_i$ are the homogeneous parts of $x$. If $A$ has no 2-torsion (in particular, if 2 is invertible) then the grade involution can be used to distinguish the even and odd parts of $A$:

$$A_i = \{x \in A : \hat x = (-1)^i x\}.$$

=== Supercommutativity ===
The supercommutator on $A$ is the binary operator given by

$$[x,y] = xy - (-1)^{|x||y|}yx$$

on homogeneous elements, extended to all of $A$ by linearity. Elements $x$ and $y$ of $A$ are said to supercommute if $[x,y] = 0$.

The supercenter of $A$ is the set of all elements of $A$ which supercommute with all elements of $A$:

$$\mathrm{Z}(A) = \{a\in A : [a,x]=0 \text{ for all } x\in A\}.$$

The supercenter of $A$ is, in general, different than the center of $A$ as an ungraded algebra. A commutative superalgebra is one whose supercenter is all of $A$.

=== Super tensor product ===
The graded tensor product of two superalgebras $A$ and $B$ may be regarded as a superalgebra $A\otimes B$ with a multiplication rule determined by:

$$(a_1\otimes b_1)(a_2\otimes b_2) = (-1)^{|b_1||a_2|}(a_1a_2\otimes b_1b_2).$$

If either $A$ or $B$ is purely even, this is equivalent to the ordinary ungraded tensor product (except that the result is graded). However, in general, the super tensor product is distinct from the tensor product of $A$ and $B$ regarded as ordinary, ungraded algebras.

== Generalizations and categorical definition ==
One can easily generalize the definition of superalgebras to include superalgebras over a commutative superring. The definition given above is then a specialization to the case where the base ring is purely even.

Let $R$ be a commutative superring. A superalgebra over $R$ is an $R$-supermodule $A$ with an $R$-bilinear multiplication $A\times A\to A$ that respects the grading. Bilinearity here means that

$$r\cdot(xy) = (r\cdot x)y = (-1)^{|r||x|}x(r\cdot y)$$

for all homogeneous elements $r\in R$ and $x,y\in A$.

Equivalently, one may define a superalgebra over $R$ as a superring $A$ together with an superring homomorphism $R\to A$ whose image lies in the supercenter of $A$.

One may also define superalgebras categorically. The category of all $R$-supermodules forms a monoidal category under the super tensor product with $R$ serving as the unit object. An associative, unital superalgebra over $R$ can then be defined as a monoid in the category of $R$-supermodules. That is, a superalgebra is an $R$-supermodule $A$ with two (even) morphisms

$$\begin{align}\mu &: A\otimes A \to A\\ \eta &: R\to A\end{align}$$

for which the usual diagrams commute.
