= Jacobi identity =

Property of some binary operations

In mathematics, the Jacobi identity is a property of some binary operations that describes how the order of evaluation, the placement of parentheses in a multiple product, affects the result of the operation. By contrast, for operations with the associative property, any order of evaluation gives the same result (parentheses in a multiple product are not needed). The identity is named after the German mathematician Carl Gustav Jacob Jacobi. He derived the Jacobi identity for Poisson brackets in his 1862 paper on differential equations.

The cross product $a\times b$ and the Lie bracket operation $[a,b]$ both satisfy the Jacobi identity. In analytical mechanics, the Jacobi identity is satisfied by the Poisson brackets. In quantum mechanics, it is satisfied by operator commutators on a Hilbert space and equivalently in the phase space formulation of quantum mechanics by the Moyal bracket.

== Definition ==
Let $+$ be a binary operation and $\times$ be an anti-commuting binary operation, and let $0$ be the identity element for $+$. The Jacobi identity is
$$x \times (y \times z) \ +\ y \times (z \times x)  \ +\ z \times (x \times y)\ =\ 0.$$

Notice the pattern in the variables on the left side of this identity. In each subsequent expression of the form $a \times (b \times c)$, the variables $x$, $y$ and $z$ are permuted according to the cycle $x \mapsto y \mapsto z \mapsto x$. Alternatively, we may observe that the ordered triples $(x,y,z)$, $(y,z,x)$ and $(z,x,y)$, are the even permutations of the ordered triple $(x,y,z)$.

== Rotating frame of reference ==
The Jacobi identity for the cross product arises from the fact that the cross product of two vectors which stay fixed relative to a rotating frame of reference also rotates with that frame of reference. Specifically, let $\mathbf{a}$ and $\mathbf{b}$ be two vectors which rotate with the frame of reference, $D$ be the relative differential operator of the frame, and $\boldsymbol{\omega}$ be the angular velocity vector. We have
$$D(\mathbf{a} \times \mathbf{b}) = \frac{d}{dt} (\mathbf{a} \times \mathbf{b}) - \boldsymbol{\omega} \times (\mathbf{a} \times \mathbf{b})$$

We also have
$$D \mathbf{a} \times \mathbf{b} + \mathbf{a} \times D \mathbf{b} = \left( \frac{d \mathbf{a}}{dt} \times \mathbf{b} - (\boldsymbol{\omega} \times \mathbf{a}) \times \mathbf{b} \right) + \left( \mathbf{a} \times \frac{d \mathbf{b}}{dt} - \mathbf{a} \times (\boldsymbol{\omega} \times \mathbf{b}) \right)$$

Both of these equations yield the zero vector because $D(\mathbf{a} \times \mathbf{b}) = D \mathbf{a} = D \mathbf{b} = \mathbf{0}$. Using bilinearity and anticommutativity of the cross product, we arrive at
$$\boldsymbol{\omega} \times (\mathbf{a} \times \mathbf{b}) + \mathbf{a} \times (\mathbf{b} \times \boldsymbol{\omega}) + \mathbf{b} \times (\boldsymbol{\omega} \times \mathbf{a}) = \mathbf{0}$$

== Commutator bracket form ==
The simplest informative example of a Lie algebra is constructed from the (associative) ring of $n\times n$ matrices, which may be thought of as infinitesimal motions of an n-dimensional vector space. The × operation is the commutator, which measures the failure of commutativity in matrix multiplication. Instead of $X\times Y$, the Lie bracket notation is used:
$$[X,Y]=XY-YX.$$

In that notation, the Jacobi identity is:
$$[X, [Y, Z] ] + [Y, [Z, X] ] + [Z, [X, Y] ] \ =\  0$$
That is easily checked by computation.

More generally, if A is an associative algebra and V is a subspace of A that is closed under the bracket operation: $[X,Y]=XY-YX$ belongs to V for all $X,Y\in V$, the Jacobi identity continues to hold on V. Thus, if a binary operation $[X,Y]$ satisfies the Jacobi identity, it may be said that it behaves as if it were given by $XY-YX$ in some associative algebra even if it is not actually defined that way.

Using the antisymmetry property $[X,Y]=-[Y,X]$, the Jacobi identity may be rewritten as a modification of the associative property:

$$[[X, Y], Z] = [X, [Y, Z]] - [Y, [X, Z]]~.$$

If $[X,Z]$ is the action of the infinitesimal motion X on Z, that can be stated as:

The action of Y followed by X (operator $[X,[Y,\cdot\ ] ]$), minus the action of X followed by Y (operator $([Y,[X,\cdot\ ] ]$), is equal to the action of $[X,Y]$, (operator $[ [X,Y],\cdot\ ]$).

There is also a plethora of graded Jacobi identities involving anticommutators $\{X,Y\}$, such as:

$$[\{X,Y\},Z]+ [\{Y,Z\},X]+[\{Z,X\},Y] =0,\qquad
[\{X,Y\},Z]+ \{[Z,Y],X\}+\{[Z,
X],Y\} =0.$$

== Adjoint form ==
Most common examples of the Jacobi identity come from the bracket multiplication $[x,y]$ on Lie algebras and Lie rings. The Jacobi identity is written as:

$$[x,[y,z]] + [z,[x,y]] + [y,[z,x]] = 0.$$

Because the bracket multiplication is antisymmetric, the Jacobi identity admits two equivalent reformulations. Defining the adjoint operator $\operatorname{ad}_x: y \mapsto [x,y]$, the identity becomes:
$$\operatorname{ad}_x[y,z]=[\operatorname{ad}_xy,z]+[y,\operatorname{ad}_xz].$$

Thus, the Jacobi identity for Lie algebras states that the action of any element on the algebra is a derivation. That form of the Jacobi identity is also used to define the notion of Leibniz algebra.

Another rearrangement shows that the Jacobi identity is equivalent to the following identity between the operators of the adjoint representation:
$$\operatorname{ad}_{[x,y]}=[\operatorname{ad}_x,\operatorname{ad}_y].$$

There, the bracket on the left side is the operation of the original algebra, the bracket on the right is the commutator of the composition of operators, and the identity states that the $\mathrm{ad}$ map sending each element to its adjoint action is a Lie algebra homomorphism.

== Related identities ==
- The Hall–Witt identity is the analogous identity for the commutator operation in a group.
- The following higher order Jacobi identity holds in arbitrary Lie algebra:
  $$[[[x_1,x_2],x_3],x_4]+[[[x_2,x_1],x_4],x_3]+[[[x_3,x_4],x_1],x_2]+[[[x_4,x_3],x_2],x_1] = 0.$$
- The Jacobi identity is equivalent to the Product Rule, with the Lie bracket acting as both a product and a derivative: $[X,[Y,Z]] = [[X,Y], Z] + [Y, [X,Z]]$. If $X, Y$ are vector fields, then $[X,Y]$ is literally a derivative operator acting on $Y$, namely the Lie derivative $\mathcal{L}_X Y$.

== See also ==
- Structure constants
- Super Jacobi identity
- Three subgroups lemma (Hall–Witt identity)
- Quintuple product identity
