= Supercommutative algebra =

Type of associative algebra that "almost commutes"

In mathematics, a supercommutative (associative) algebra (sometimes termed a commutative superalgebra) is a superalgebra (i.e. a Z_{2}-graded algebra) such that for any two homogeneous elements x, y we have

$$yx = (-1)^{|x| |y|}xy ,$$

where |x| denotes the grade of the element and is 0 or 1 (in Z_{2}) according to whether the grade is even or odd, respectively.

Equivalently, it is a superalgebra where the supercommutator

$$[x,y] = xy - (-1)^{|x| |y|}yx$$

always vanishes. Algebraic structures which supercommute in the above sense are sometimes referred to as skew-commutative associative algebras to emphasize the anti-commutation, or, to emphasize the grading, graded-commutative or, if the supercommutativity is understood, simply commutative.

Any commutative algebra is a supercommutative algebra if given the trivial gradation (i.e. all elements are even). Grassmann algebras (also known as exterior algebras) are the most common examples of nontrivial supercommutative algebras. The supercenter of any superalgebra is the set of elements that supercommute with all elements, and is a supercommutative algebra.

The even subalgebra of a supercommutative algebra is always a commutative algebra. That is, even elements always commute. Odd elements, on the other hand, always anticommute. That is,

$$xy + yx = 0\,$$

for odd x and y. In particular, the square of any odd element x vanishes whenever 2 is invertible:

$$x^2 = 0 .$$

Thus a commutative superalgebra (with 2 invertible and nonzero degree one component) always contains nilpotent elements.

A Z-graded anticommutative algebra with the property that x^{2} = 0 for every element x of odd grade (irrespective of whether 2 is invertible) is called an alternating algebra.

== See also ==
- Graded-commutative ring
- Lie superalgebra
