= Non-critical string theory =

Theory in physics

The non-critical string theory describes the relativistic string without enforcing the critical dimension. Although this allows the construction of a string theory in 4 spacetime dimensions, such a theory usually does not describe a Lorentz invariant background. However, there are recent developments which make possible Lorentz invariant quantization of string theory in 4-dimensional Minkowski space-time.

There are several applications of the non-critical string. Through the AdS/CFT correspondence it provides a holographic description of gauge theories which are asymptotically free. It may then have applications to the study of the QCD, the theory of strong interactions between quarks.

== The critical dimension and central charge ==
In order for a string theory to be consistent, the worldsheet theory must be conformally invariant. The obstruction to conformal symmetry is known as the Weyl anomaly and is proportional to the central charge of the worldsheet theory. In order to preserve conformal symmetry the Weyl anomaly, and thus the central charge, must vanish. For the bosonic string this can be accomplished by a worldsheet theory consisting of 26 free bosons. Since each boson is interpreted as a flat spacetime dimension, the critical dimension of the bosonic string is 26. A similar logic for the superstring results in 10 free bosons (and 10 free fermions as required by worldsheet supersymmetry). The bosons are again interpreted as spacetime dimensions and so the critical dimension for the superstring is 10. A string theory which is formulated in the critical dimension is called a critical string.

The non-critical string is not formulated with the critical dimension, but nonetheless has vanishing Weyl anomaly. A worldsheet theory with the correct central charge can be constructed by introducing a non-trivial target space, commonly by giving an expectation value to the dilaton which varies linearly along some spacetime direction. (From the point of view of the worldsheet CFT, this corresponds to having a background charge.) For this reason non-critical string theory is sometimes called the linear dilaton theory. Since the dilaton is related to the string coupling constant, this theory contains a region where the coupling is weak (and so perturbation theory is valid) and another region where the theory is strongly coupled. For dilaton varying along a spacelike direction, the dimension of the theory is less than the critical dimension and so the theory is termed subcritical. For dilaton varying along a timelike direction, the dimension is greater than the critical dimension and the theory is termed supercritical. The dilaton can also vary along a lightlike direction, in which case the dimension is equal to the critical dimension and the theory is a critical string theory.

== Two-dimensional string theory ==
Perhaps the most studied example of non-critical string theory is that with two-dimensional target space. While clearly not of phenomenological interest, string theories in two dimensions serve as important toy models. They allow one to probe interesting concepts which would be computationally intractable in a more realistic scenario.

These models often have fully non-perturbative descriptions in the form of the quantum mechanics of large matrices. Such a description known as the c=1 matrix model captures the dynamics of bosonic string theory in two dimensions. Of much recent interest are matrix models of the two-dimensional Type 0 string theories. These "matrix models" are understood as describing the dynamics of open strings lying on D-branes in these theories. Degrees of freedom associated with closed strings, and spacetime itself, appear as emergent phenomena, providing an important example of open string tachyon condensation in string theory.

== See also ==
- String theory, for general information about critical superstrings
- Weyl anomaly
- Central charge
- Liouville gravity
