= Type 0 string theory =

The Type 0 string theory is a less well-known model of string theory. It is a superstring theory in the sense that the worldsheet theory is supersymmetric. However, the spacetime spectrum is not supersymmetric and, in fact, does not contain any fermions at all. In dimensions greater than two, the ground state is a tachyon so the theory is unstable. These properties make it similar to the bosonic string and an unsuitable proposal for describing the world as we observe it, although a GSO projection does get rid of the tachyon and the even G-parity sector of the theory defines a stable string theory. The theory is used sometimes as a toy model for exploring concepts in string theory, notably closed string tachyon condensation. Some other recent interest has involved the two-dimensional Type 0 string which has a non-perturbatively stable matrix model description.

Like the Type II string, different GSO projections result in slightly different theories, Type 0A and Type 0B. The difference lies in which types of Ramond–Ramond fields lie in the massless spectrum.
