= Two-dimensional critical Ising model =

Conformal field theory of the 2D Ising model critical point

The two-dimensional critical Ising model is the critical limit of the Ising model in two dimensions. It has local conformal symmetry, described by the Virasoro algebra with the central charge $c=\tfrac12$. Correlation functions of the spin and energy operators, and more generally of spin polynomials, are described by a two-dimensional conformal field theory called the $(4, 3)$ minimal model. While the minimal model has been exactly solved (see Ising critical exponents), the solution does not cover other observables such as connectivities of clusters.

== The minimal model ==
=== Space of states and conformal dimensions ===
The Kac table of the $(4, 3)$ minimal model is:

$$\begin{array}{c|ccc} 2 & \frac{1}{2} & \frac{1}{16} & 0 \\ 1 & 0 & \frac{1}{16} & \frac{1}{2} \\  \hline & 1 & 2 & 3 \end{array}$$

This means that the space of states is generated by three primary states, which correspond to three primary fields or operators:

$$\begin{array}{cccc}
\hline
\text{Kac table indices} & \text{Dimension} & \text{Primary field} & \text{Name}
\\
\hline
(1,1) \text{ or } (3,2) &  0 & \mathbf{1} & \text{Identity}
\\
(2,1) \text{ or } (2,2) & \frac{1}{16} & \sigma & \text{Spin}
\\
(1,2) \text{ or } (3,1) &  \frac12  & \epsilon  & \text{Energy}
\\
\hline
\end{array}$$

The decomposition of the space of states into irreducible representations of the product of the left- and right-moving Virasoro algebras is

$$\mathcal{S} =  \mathcal{R}_{0} \otimes \bar{\mathcal{R}}_0
\oplus \mathcal{R}_{\frac{1}{16}} \otimes \bar{\mathcal{R}}_\frac{1}{16}
\oplus \mathcal{R}_\frac12 \otimes \bar{\mathcal{R}}_\frac12$$

where $\mathcal{R}_\Delta$ is the irreducible highest-weight representation of the Virasoro algebra with the conformal dimension $\Delta$. In particular, the Ising model is diagonal and unitary.

=== Characters and partition function ===
The characters of the three representations of the Virasoro algebra that appear in the space of states are

$$\begin{align}
\chi_0(q) &= \frac{1}{\eta(q)} \sum_{k\in\mathbb{Z}}\left( q^\frac{(24k+1)^2}{48} -q^\frac{(24k+7)^2}{48}\right)
= \frac{1}{2\sqrt{\eta(q)}}\left(\sqrt{\theta_3(0|q)} + \sqrt{\theta_4(0|q)}\right)
\\
\chi_{\frac{1}{16}}(q) &= \frac{1}{\eta(q)} \sum_{k\in\mathbb{Z}}\left( q^\frac{(24k+2)^2}{48} -q^\frac{(24k+10)^2}{48}\right)  = \frac{1}{\sqrt{2\eta(q)}}\sqrt{\theta_2(0|q)}
\\
\chi_{\frac12}(q) &= \frac{1}{\eta(q)} \sum_{k\in\mathbb{Z}}\left( q^\frac{(24k+5)^2}{48} -q^\frac{(24k+11)^2}{48}\right) = \frac{1}{2\sqrt{\eta(q)}}\left(\sqrt{\theta_3(0|q)} - \sqrt{\theta_4(0|q)}\right)
\end{align}$$

where $\eta(q)$ is the Dedekind eta function, and $\theta_i(0|q)$ are theta functions of the nome $q=e^{2\pi i\tau}$, for example $\theta_3(0|q)=\sum_{n\in\mathbb{Z}} q^{\frac{n^2}{2}}$. The modular S-matrix, i.e. the matrix $\mathcal{S}$ such that $\chi_i(-\tfrac{1}{\tau}) = \sum_j \mathcal{S}_{ij}\chi_j(\tau)$, is

$$\mathcal{S} = \frac12 \left(\begin{array}{ccc} 1  & 1 & \sqrt{2}\\ 1  & 1 & -\sqrt{2} \\ \sqrt{2} & -\sqrt{2} & 0 \end{array}\right)$$

where the fields are ordered as $1,\epsilon, \sigma$. The modular invariant partition function is

$$Z(q) = \left|\chi_0(q)\right|^2 + \left|\chi_{\frac{1}{16}}(q)\right|^2
+ \left|\chi_\frac12(q)\right|^2 = \frac{|\theta_2(0|q)|+ |\theta_3(0|q)|+|\theta_4(0|q)|}{2|\eta(q)|}$$

=== Fusion rules and operator product expansions ===
The fusion rules of the model are

$$\begin{align}
\mathbf{1}\times \mathbf{1} &= \mathbf{1}
\\
\mathbf{1}\times \sigma &= \sigma
\\
\mathbf{1}\times \epsilon &= \epsilon
\\
\sigma \times \sigma &= \mathbf{1} + \epsilon
\\
\sigma \times \epsilon &= \sigma
\\
\epsilon \times \epsilon &= \mathbf{1}
\end{align}$$

The fusion rules are invariant under the $\mathbb{Z}_2$ symmetry $\sigma \to -\sigma$. The three-point structure constants are

$$C_{\mathbf{1}\mathbf{1}\mathbf{1}} = C_{\mathbf{1}\epsilon\epsilon} = C_{\mathbf{1}\sigma\sigma} = 1  \quad , \quad C_{\sigma\sigma\epsilon} = \frac12$$

Knowing the fusion rules and three-point structure constants, it is possible to write operator product expansions, for example

$$\begin{align}
\sigma(z)\sigma(0) &= |z|^{2\Delta_\mathbf{1} - 4\Delta_\sigma}
C_{\mathbf{1}\sigma\sigma}\Big(\mathbf{1}(0) + O(z)\Big)
+ |z|^{2\Delta_\epsilon -4\Delta_\sigma} C_{\sigma\sigma\epsilon} \Big(\epsilon(0) + O(z)\Big)
\\
&= |z|^{-\frac14} \Big(\mathbf{1}(0) + O(z)\Big) +\frac12 |z|^\frac34 \Big(\epsilon(0) + O(z)\Big)
\end{align}$$

where $\Delta_\mathbf{1},\Delta_\sigma,\Delta_\epsilon$ are the conformal dimensions of the primary fields, and the omitted terms $O(z)$ are contributions of descendant fields.

=== Correlation functions on the sphere ===
Any one-, two- and three-point function of primary fields is determined by conformal symmetry up to a multiplicative constant. This constant is set to be one for one- and two-point functions by a choice of field normalizations. The only non-trivial dynamical quantities are the three-point structure constants, which were given above in the context of operator product expansions.

$$\left\langle \mathbf{1}(z_1)\right\rangle = 1  \ , \
\left\langle\sigma(z_1)\right\rangle = 0 \ , \
\left\langle\epsilon(z_1)\right\rangle = 0$$

$$\left\langle \mathbf{1}(z_1)\mathbf{1}(z_2)\right\rangle = 1
\ , \ \left\langle\sigma(z_1)\sigma(z_2)\right\rangle = |z_{12}|^{-\frac14} \ , \ \left\langle\epsilon(z_1)\epsilon(z_2)\right\rangle = |z_{12}|^{-2}$$

with $z_{ij} = z_i-z_j$.

$$\langle \mathbf{1}\sigma \rangle = \langle \mathbf{1}\epsilon\rangle = \langle \sigma \epsilon \rangle = 0$$

$$\left\langle \mathbf{1}(z_1)\mathbf{1}(z_2)\mathbf{1}(z_3)\right\rangle = 1
\ , \ \left\langle\sigma(z_1)\sigma(z_2)\mathbf{1}(z_3)\right\rangle = |z_{12}|^{-\frac14}
\ , \ \left\langle\epsilon(z_1)\epsilon(z_2)\mathbf{1}(z_3)\right\rangle = |z_{12}|^{-2}$$

$$\left\langle \sigma(z_1)\sigma(z_2)\epsilon(z_3)\right\rangle = \frac12 |z_{12}|^{\frac34} |z_{13}|^{-1} |z_{23}|^{-1}$$

$$\langle \mathbf{1}\mathbf{1}\sigma \rangle
=
\langle \mathbf{1}\mathbf{1}\epsilon \rangle
=
\langle \mathbf{1}\sigma\epsilon \rangle
=
\langle \sigma\epsilon\epsilon \rangle
=
\langle \sigma \sigma \sigma \rangle
=
\langle \epsilon \epsilon\epsilon \rangle
= 0$$

The three non-trivial four-point functions are of the type $\langle \sigma^4\rangle, \langle \sigma^2\epsilon^2\rangle, \langle \epsilon^4\rangle$. For a four-point function $\left\langle\prod_{i=1}^4 V_i(z_i)\right\rangle$, let $\mathcal{F}^{(s)}_j$ and $\mathcal{F}^{(t)}_j$ be the s- and t-channel Virasoro conformal blocks, which respectively correspond to the contributions of $V_j(z_2)$ (and its descendants) in the operator product expansion $V_1(z_1)V_2(z_2)$, and of $V_j(z_4)$ (and its descendants) in the operator product expansion $V_1(z_1)V_4(z_4)$. Let $x=\frac{z_{12}z_{34}}{z_{13}z_{24}}$ be the cross-ratio.

In the case of $\langle \epsilon^4\rangle$, fusion rules allow only one primary field in all channels, namely the identity field.

$$\begin{align}
& \langle \epsilon^4\rangle = \left|\mathcal{F}^{(s)}_\textbf{1}\right|^2 = \left|\mathcal{F}^{(t)}_\textbf{1}\right|^2
\\
& \mathcal{F}^{(s)}_\textbf{1}
= \mathcal{F}^{(t)}_\textbf{1}
= \left[\prod_{1\leq i<j\leq 4} z_{ij}^{-\frac13}\right] \frac{1-x+x^2}{x^\frac23(1-x)^\frac23}
\ \underset{(z_i)=(x, 0,\infty, 1)}{=}\ \frac{1}{x(1-x)} -1
\end{align}$$

In the case of $\langle \sigma^2\epsilon^2\rangle$, fusion rules allow only the identity field in the s-channel, and the spin field in the t-channel.

$$\begin{align}
& \langle \sigma^2\epsilon^2\rangle = \left|\mathcal{F}^{(s)}_\textbf{1}\right|^2 = C_{\sigma\sigma\epsilon}^2\left|\mathcal{F}^{(t)}_\sigma\right|^2  = \frac14\left|\mathcal{F}^{(t)}_\sigma\right|^2
\\
& \mathcal{F}^{(s)}_\textbf{1}
= \frac12 \mathcal{F}^{(t)}_\sigma
=\left[z_{12}^\frac14 z_{34}^{-\frac58}\left(z_{13}z_{24}z_{14}z_{23}\right)^{-\frac{3}{16}} \right]\frac{1-\frac{x}{2}}{x^\frac38(1-x)^\frac{5}{16}}
\ \underset{(z_i)=(x, 0,\infty, 1)}{=}\
\frac{1-\frac{x}{2}}{x^\frac18(1-x)^\frac12}
\end{align}$$

In the case of $\langle \sigma^4\rangle$, fusion rules allow two primary fields in all channels: the identity field and the energy field. In this case we write the conformal blocks in the case $(z_1,z_2,z_3,z_4)=(x,0,\infty,1)$ only: the general case is obtained by inserting the prefactor $x^\frac{1}{24}(1-x)^\frac{1}{24}\prod_{1\leq i<j\leq 4} z_{ij}^{-\frac{1}{24}}$, and identifying $x$ with the cross-ratio.

$$\begin{align}
\langle \sigma^4\rangle &=
\left|\mathcal{F}_\textbf{1}^{(s)}\right|^2 + \frac14 \left|\mathcal{F}_{\epsilon}^{(s)}\right|^2
=
\left|\mathcal{F}_\textbf{1}^{(t)}\right|^2 + \frac14 \left|\mathcal{F}_{\epsilon}^{(t)}\right|^2
\\
&=
\frac{|1+\sqrt{x}|+|1-\sqrt{x}|}{2|x|^\frac14 |1-x|^\frac14}
\ \underset{x\in (0, 1)}{=}\ \frac{1}{|x|^\frac14 |1-x|^\frac14}
\end{align}$$

In the case of $\langle \sigma^4\rangle$, the conformal blocks are:

$$\begin{align}
& \mathcal{F}_\textbf{1}^{(s)}
= \frac{\sqrt{\frac{1+\sqrt{1-x}}{2}}}{x^\frac18(1-x)^\frac18}
\ ,\;\;
\mathcal{F}_{\epsilon}^{(s)}
=
\frac{\sqrt{2-2\sqrt{1-x}}}{x^\frac18(1-x)^\frac18}
\\ &
\mathcal{F}_\textbf{1}^{(t)}
= \frac{\mathcal{F}^{(s)}_\textbf{1}}{\sqrt{2}} + \frac{\mathcal{F}^{(s)}_\epsilon}{2\sqrt{2}}
= \frac{\sqrt{\frac{1+\sqrt{x}}{2}}}{x^\frac18(1-x)^\frac18}
\ ,\;\;
\mathcal{F}_{\epsilon}^{(t)}
= \sqrt{2}\mathcal{F}^{(s)}_\textbf{1} - \frac{\mathcal{F}^{(s)}_\epsilon}{\sqrt{2}}
=
\frac{\sqrt{2-2\sqrt{x}}}{x^\frac18(1-x)^\frac18}
\end{align}$$

From the representation of the model in terms of Dirac fermions, it is possible to compute correlation functions of any number of spin or energy operators:

$$\left\langle \prod_{i=1}^{2n} \epsilon(z_i)\right\rangle^2
= \left| \det\left(\frac{1}{z_{ij}}\right)_{1\leq i\neq j\leq 2n} \right|^2$$

$$\left\langle \prod_{i=1}^{2n} \sigma(z_i)\right\rangle^2
= \frac{1}{2^n}\sum_{\begin{array}{c}\epsilon_i=\pm 1 \\ \sum_{i=1}^{2n}\epsilon_i=0\end{array}} \prod_{1\leq i<j\leq 2n} |z_{ij}|^{\frac{\epsilon_i\epsilon_j}{2}}$$

These formulas have generalizations to correlation functions on the torus, which involve theta functions.

== Other observables ==
=== Disorder operator ===
The two-dimensional Ising model is mapped to itself by a high-low temperature duality. The image of the spin operator $\sigma$ under this duality is a disorder operator $\mu$, which has the same left and right conformal dimensions $(\Delta_\mu,\bar\Delta_\mu) = (\Delta_\sigma,\bar \Delta_\sigma)=(\tfrac{1}{16},\tfrac{1}{16})$. Although the disorder operator does not belong to the minimal model, correlation functions involving the disorder operator can be computed exactly, for example

$$\left\langle \sigma(z_1)\mu(z_2)\sigma(z_3)\mu(z_4)\right\rangle^2
= \frac12 \sqrt{\frac{|z_{13}z_{24}|}{|z_{12}z_{34}z_{23}z_{14}|}}
\Big( |x|+|1-x|-1 \Big)$$

whereas

$$\left\langle \prod_{i=1}^4\mu(z_i)\right\rangle^2
=
\left\langle \prod_{i=1}^4\sigma(z_i)\right\rangle^2
= \frac12 \sqrt{\frac{|z_{13}z_{24}|}{|z_{12}z_{34}z_{23}z_{14}|}}
\Big( |x|+|1-x|+1 \Big)$$

=== Connectivities of clusters ===
The Ising model has a description as a random cluster model due to Fortuin and Kasteleyn. In this description, the observables include connectivities of clusters, i.e. probabilities that a number of points belong to the same cluster. The Ising model can then be viewed as the case $q=2$ of the $q$-state Potts model, whose parameter $q$ can vary continuously, and is related to the central charge of the Virasoro algebra.

In the critical limit, connectivities of clusters have the same behaviour under conformal transformations as correlation functions of the spin operator. Nevertheless, connectivities do not coincide with spin correlation functions: for example, the three-point connectivity does not vanish, while $\langle\sigma\sigma\sigma\rangle=0$. There are four independent four-point connectivities, and their sum coincides with $\langle\sigma\sigma\sigma\sigma\rangle$. Other combinations of four-point connectivities are not known analytically. In particular they are not related to correlation functions of the minimal model, although they are related to the $q\to 2$ limit of spin correlators in the $q$-state Potts model.
