= Lorentz invariance in non-critical string theory =

Aspect of non-critical string theory

Usually non-critical string theory is considered in frames of the approach proposed by Polyakov. The other approach has been developed in. It represents a universal method to maintain explicit Lorentz invariance in any quantum relativistic theory. On an example of Nambu-Goto string theory in 4-dimensional Minkowski space-time the idea can be demonstrated as follows:

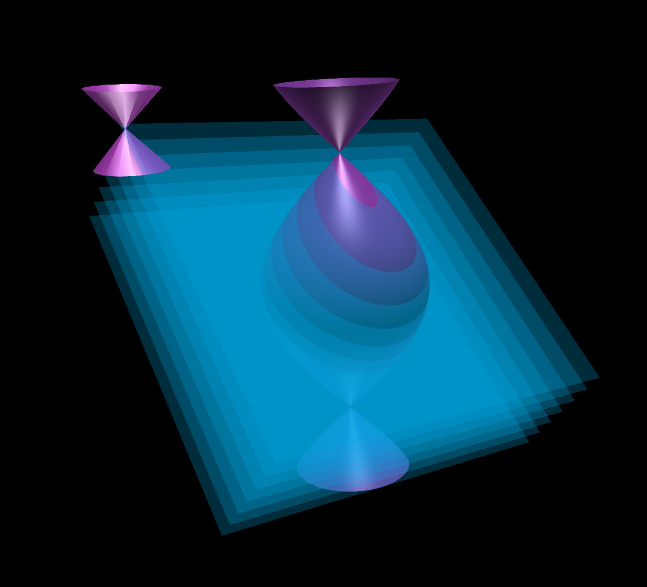
Light cone gauge.

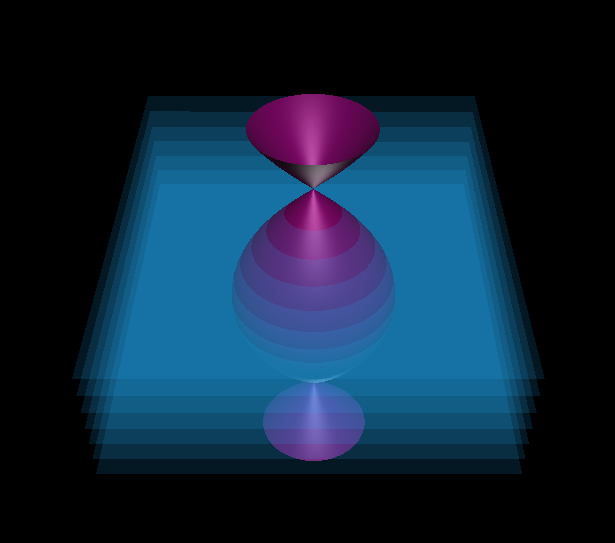
Time-like Rohrlich's gauge.

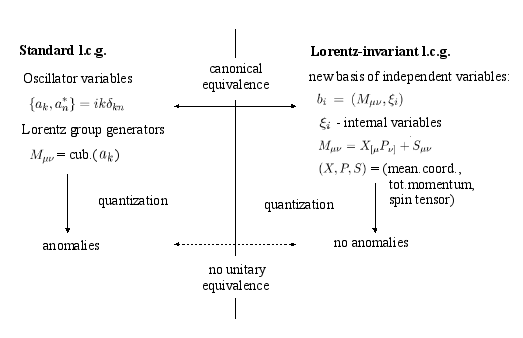
Canonical transformation.

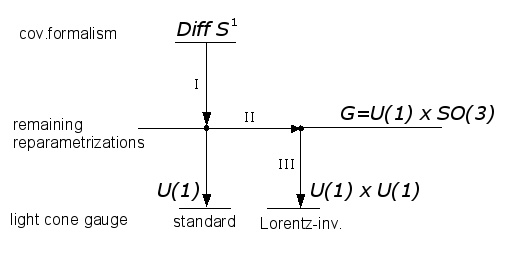
Gauge symmetries.

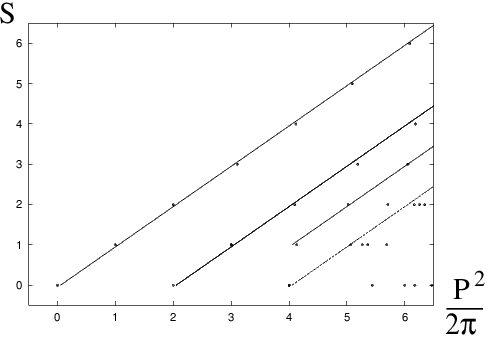
Spin-mass spectrum. Lorentz-invariant light cone gauge is related with singularities of DDF vector fields.

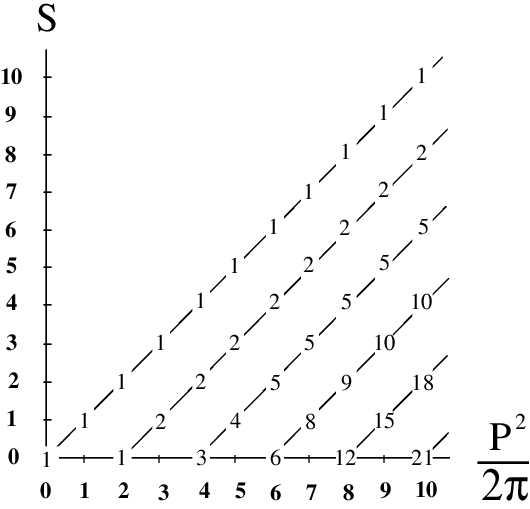
Spin-mass spectrum. A restricted class of string motion is considered corresponding to the world sheets with axial symmetry. Lorentz-invariant light cone gauge is related with the symmetry axis.

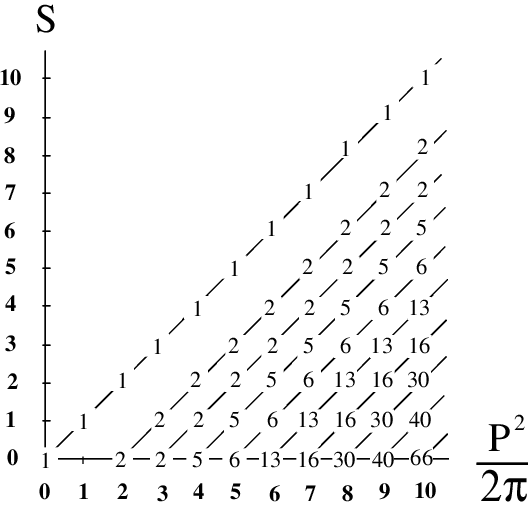
Spin-mass spectrum. Lorentz-invariant Rohrlich's gauge is related with the period of the world sheet.

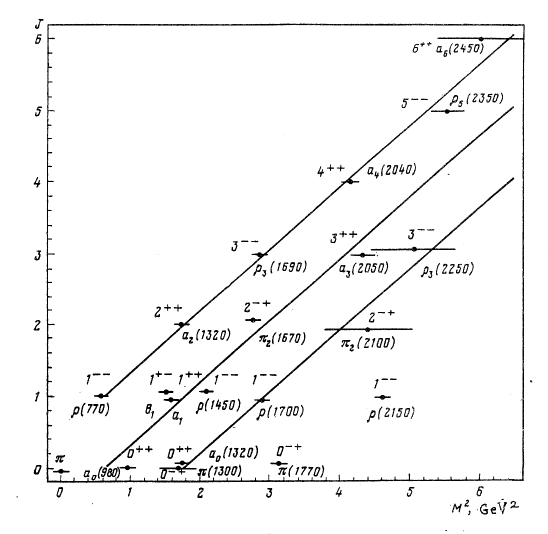
Experimental spin-mass spectrum of light mesons superimposed with prediction of string model.

Geometrically the world sheet of string is sliced by a system of parallel planes to fix a specific parametrization, or gauge on it. The planes are defined by a normal vector n_{μ}, the gauge axis. If this vector belongs to light cone, the parametrization corresponds to light cone gauge, if it is directed along world sheet's period P_{μ}, it is time-like Rohrlich's gauge. The problem of the standard light cone gauge is that the vector n_{μ} is constant, e.g. n_{μ} = (1, 1, 0, 0), and the system of planes is "frozen" in Minkowski space-time. Lorentz transformations change the position of the world sheet with respect to these fixed planes, and they are followed by reparametrizations of the world sheet. On the quantum level the reparametrization group has anomaly, which appears also in Lorentz group and violates Lorentz invariance of the theory. On the other hand, the Rohrlich's gauge relates n_{μ} with the world sheet itself. As a result, the Lorentz generators transform n_{μ} and the world sheet simultaneously, without reparametrizations. The same property holds if one relates light-like axis n_{μ} with the world sheet, using in addition to P_{μ} other dynamical vectors available in string theory. In this way one constructs Lorentz-invariant parametrization of the world sheet, where the Lorentz group acts trivially and does not have quantum anomalies.

Algebraically this corresponds to a canonical transformation a_{i} -> b_{i} in the classical mechanics to a new set of variables, explicitly containing all necessary generators of symmetries. For the standard light cone gauge the Lorentz generators M_{μν} are cubic in terms of oscillator variables a_{i}, and their quantization acquires well known anomaly. Consider a set b_{i} = (M_{μν},ξ_{i}) which contains the Lorentz group generators and internal variables ξ_{i}, complementing M_{μν} to the full phase space. In selection of such a set, one needs to take care that ξ_{i} will have simple Poisson brackets with M_{μν} and among themselves. Local existence of such variables is provided by Darboux's theorem. Quantization in the new set of variables eliminates anomaly from the Lorentz group. Canonically equivalent classical theories do not necessarily correspond to unitary equivalent quantum theories, that's why quantum anomalies could be present in one approach and absent in the other one.

Group-theoretically string theory has a gauge symmetry Diff S^{1}, reparametrizations of a circle. The symmetry is generated by Virasoro algebra L_{n}. Standard light cone gauge fixes the most of gauge degrees of freedom leaving only trivial phase rotations U(1) ~ S^{1}. They correspond to periodical string evolution, generated by Hamiltonian L_{0}. Let's introduce an additional layer on this diagram: a group G = U(1) x SO(3) of gauge transformations of the world sheet, including the trivial evolution factor and rotations of the gauge axis in center-of-mass frame, with respect to the fixed world sheet. Standard light cone gauge corresponds to a selection of one point in SO(3) factor, leading to Lorentz non-invariant parametrization. Therefore, one must select a different representative on the gauge orbit of G, this time related with the world sheet in Lorentz invariant way. After reduction of the mechanics to this representative anomalous gauge degrees of freedom are removed from the theory. The trivial gauge symmetry U(1) x U(1) remains, including evolution and those rotations which preserve the direction of gauge axis.

Successful implementation of this program has been done in . These are several unitary non-equivalent versions of the quantum open Nambu-Goto string theory, where the gauge axis is attached to different geometrical features of the world sheet. Their common properties are

- explicit Lorentz-invariance at d=4
- reparametrization degrees of freedom fixed by the gauge
- Regge-like spin-mass spectrum

The reader familiar with variety of branches co-existing in modern string theory will not wonder why many different quantum theories can be constructed for essentially the same physical system. The approach described here does not intend to produce a unique ultimate result, it just provides a set of tools suitable for construction of your own quantum string theory. Since any value of dimension can be used, and especially d=4, the applications could be more realistic. For example, the approach can be applied in physics of hadrons, to describe their spectra and electromagnetic interactions .

== See also ==
The following textbooks on string theory mention a possibility of anomaly-free quantization of the string outside critical dimension:

- L. Brink, M. Henneaux, Principles of String Theory, Plenum Press, New York and London, (1988), p. 157

Should one not try to use a different representation

of the string operators so as to avoid the central charge? Again, it might very well be possible to construct such a representation and, if so, it is very likely that the resulting quantum theory would be very different from the one explained here. It could be that this yet-to-be-constructed theory would possess an intrinsic interest of its own (e.g., through the occurrence of infinite-dimensional representations of the Lorentz algebra). Moreover, because this theory would not be based on the use of oscillator variables, it might be more easily extendable to higher-dimensional objects, such as the membrane.

Further, on pp. 157–159, the quantum solutions of closed string theory in the class of non-oscillator representations possessing no anomaly in Virasoro algebra at arbitrary even value of dimension are explicitly presented.

- B.M. Barbashov, V.V. Nesterenko, Introduction to the Relativistic String Theory, Singapore, World Scientific, (1990), p. 64:

It is difficult to understand that such a thoroughly studied

object in classical theory and nonrelativistic quantum mechanics as the string cannot consistently be analyzed at the quantum level in a realistic 4-dimensional space-time. Attempts were undertaken to find other quantum solutions for the relativistic string problem which would not encounter the above difficulties.

Further, in Sec.11 and Sec.30 quantization of non-critical string theory in frames of the approaches by Rohrlich and Polyakov is described.

- M. Green, J. Schwarz, E. Witten, Superstring Theory Vol. 1, Cambridge Univ. Press, (1987), p. 124:

considering contribution of conformal factor φ in the path integral, it is noticed:

It is conceivable that the integral (3.1.13) is physically

sensible even if the φ dependence does not cancel. This possibility has motivated some very ingenious suggestions, but remains uncertain. In any case, for superstring unification the critical dimension in which the φ dependence cancels is preferred, since in most suggestions about how to get outside of the critical dimension, one expects to lose the massless particles that are present in the critical dimension.

Note: this does not exclude usage of non-critical string theory in the physics of hadrons, where all coupled states are massive. Here only self-consistence of the theory, particularly its Lorentz invariance, is required.
