= Massless free scalar bosons in two dimensions =

2D conformal field theories

Massless free scalar bosons are a family of two-dimensional conformal field theories, whose symmetry is described by an abelian affine Lie algebra.

Since they are free i.e. non-interacting, free bosonic CFTs are easily solved exactly. Via the Coulomb gas formalism, they lead to exact results in interacting CFTs such as minimal models. Moreover, they play an important role in the worldsheet approach to string theory.

In a free bosonic CFT, the Virasoro algebra's central charge can take any complex value. However, the value $c=1$ is sometimes implicitly assumed. For $c=1$, there exist compactified free bosonic CFTs with arbitrary values of the compactification radius.

== Lagrangian formulation ==
The action of a free bosonic theory in two dimensions is a functional of the free boson $\phi$,

$$S[\phi] = \frac{1}{4\pi } \int d^2x \sqrt{g} (g^{\mu \nu} \partial_\mu \phi \partial _{\nu} \phi + Q R \phi )\ ,$$

where $g_{\mu \nu}$ is the metric of the two-dimensional space on which the theory is formulated, $R$ is the Ricci scalar of that space. The parameter $Q\in\mathbb{C}$ is called the background charge.

What is special to two dimensions is that the scaling dimension of the free boson $\phi$ vanishes. This permits the presence of a non-vanishing background charge, and is at the origin of the theory's conformal symmetry.

In probability theory, the free boson can be constructed as a Gaussian free field. This provides realizations of correlation functions as expected values of random variables.

== Symmetries ==
=== Abelian affine Lie algebra ===
The symmetry algebra is generated by two chiral conserved currents: a left-moving current and a right-moving current, respectively

$$J=\partial \phi \quad \text{and} \quad \bar{J}=\bar\partial\phi$$

which obey $\partial\bar J = \bar \partial J = 0$. Each current generates an abelian affine Lie algebra $\hat{\mathfrak{u}}_1$. The structure of the left-moving affine Lie algebra is encoded in the left-moving current's self-OPE,

$$J(y)J(z)=\frac{-\frac12}{(y-z)^2} + O(1)$$

Equivalently, if the current is written as a Laurent series $J(z)=\sum_{n\in\mathbb{Z}} J_nz^{-n-1}$ about the point $z=0$, the abelian affine Lie algebra is characterized by the Lie bracket

$$[J_m,J_n] =\frac12 n\delta_{m+n,0}$$

The center of the algebra is generated by $J_0$, and the algebra is a direct sum of mutually commuting subalgebras of dimension 1 or 2:

$$\hat{\mathfrak{u}}_1 = \text{Span}(J_0) \oplus \bigoplus_{n=1}^\infty \text{Span}(J_n,J_{-n})$$

=== Conformal symmetry ===
For any value of $Q\in\mathbb{C}$, the abelian affine Lie algebra's universal enveloping algebra has a Virasoro subalgebra with the generators

$$\begin{align}
L_n &= -\sum_{m\in{\mathbb{Z}}} J_{n-m}J_m + Q(n+1)J_n\ , \qquad (n\neq 0)\ ,
\\
L_0 &=-2\sum_{m=1}^\infty J_{-m}J_m -J_0^2+QJ_0 \ ,
\end{align}$$

The central charge of this Virasoro subalgebra is

$$c = 1 + 6Q^2$$

and the commutation relations of the Virasoro generators with the affine Lie algebra generators are

$$[L_m,J_n] = -nJ_{m+n} -\frac{Q}{2}m(m+1) \delta_{m+n,0}$$

If the parameter $Q$ coincides with the free boson's background charge, then the field $T(z) = \sum_{n\in\mathbb{Z}} L_n z^{-n-2}$ coincides with the free boson's energy-momentum tensor. The corresponding Virasoro algebra therefore has a geometrical interpretation as the algebra of infinitesimal conformal maps, and encodes the theory's local conformal symmetry.

=== Extra symmetries ===
For special values of the central charge and/or of the radius of compactification, free bosonic theories can have not only their $\hat{\mathfrak{u}}_1$ symmetry, but also additional symmetries. In particular, at $c=1$, for special values of the radius of compactification, there may appear non-abelian affine Lie algebras, supersymmetry, etc.

== Affine primary fields ==
In a free bosonic CFT, all fields are either affine primary fields or affine descendants thereof. Thanks to the affine symmetry, correlation functions of affine descendant fields can in principle be deduced from correlation functions of affine primary fields.

=== Definition ===
An affine primary field $V_{\alpha, \bar\alpha}(z)$ with the left and right $\hat{\mathfrak{u}}_1$-charges $\alpha,\bar\alpha$ is defined by its OPEs with the currents,

$$J(y)V_{\alpha, \bar\alpha}(z) = \frac{\alpha}{y-z} V_{\alpha, \bar\alpha}(z) + O(1) \quad ,\quad \bar J(y)V_{\alpha, \bar\alpha}(z) = \frac{\bar\alpha}{\bar y-\bar z} V_{\alpha, \bar\alpha}(z) + O(1)$$

These OPEs are equivalent to the relations

$$J_{n>0} V_{\alpha, \bar\alpha}(z) = \bar J_{n>0} V_{\alpha, \bar\alpha}(z)=0  \quad , \quad J_0V_{\alpha, \bar\alpha}(z) = \alpha V_{\alpha, \bar\alpha}(z) \quad , \quad \bar J_0V_{\alpha, \bar\alpha}(z) = \bar\alpha V_{\alpha, \bar\alpha}(z)$$

The charges $\alpha,\bar\alpha$ are also called the left- and right-moving momentums. If they coincide, the affine primary field is called diagonal and written as $V_\alpha(z)=V_{\alpha,\alpha}(z)$.

Normal-ordered exponentials of the free boson are affine primary fields. In particular, the field $:e^{2\alpha\phi(z)}:$ is a diagonal affine primary field with momentum $\alpha$. This field, and affine primary fields in general, are sometimes called vertex operators.

An affine primary field is also a Virasoro primary field with the conformal dimension

$$\Delta(\alpha) = \alpha(Q-\alpha)$$

The two fields $V_{\alpha}(z)$ and $V_{Q-\alpha}(z)$ have the same left and right conformal dimensions, although their momentums are different.

=== OPEs and momentum conservation ===
Due to the affine symmetry, momentum is conserved in free bosonic CFTs. At the level of fusion rules, this means that only one affine primary field can appear in the fusion of any two affine primary fields,

$$V_{\alpha_1,\bar\alpha_1} \times V_{\alpha_2,\bar\alpha_2} = V_{\alpha_1+\alpha_2,\bar\alpha_1+\bar\alpha_2}$$

Operator product expansions of affine primary fields therefore take the form

$$V_{\alpha_1,\bar\alpha_1}(z_1)V_{\alpha_2,\bar\alpha_2}(z_2) = C(\alpha_i,\bar\alpha_i) (z_1-z_2)^{-2\alpha_1\alpha_2} (\bar z_1-\bar z_2)^{-2\bar \alpha_1\bar\alpha_2}\left( V_{\alpha_1+\alpha_2,\bar\alpha_1+\bar\alpha_2}(z_2) + O(z_1-z_2)\right)$$

where $C(\alpha_i,\bar \alpha_i)$ is the OPE coefficient, and the term $O(z_1-z_2)$ is the contribution of affine descendant fields. OPEs have no manifest dependence on the background charge.

=== Correlation functions ===
According to the affine Ward identities for $N$-point functions on the sphere,

$$\left\langle\prod_{i=1}^N V_{\alpha_i,\bar\alpha_i}(z_i)\right\rangle \neq 0
\implies
\sum_{i=1}^N \alpha_i = \sum_{i=1}^N\bar \alpha_i = Q$$

Moreover, the affine symmetry completely determines the dependence of sphere $N$-point functions on the positions,

$$\left\langle\prod_{i=1}^N V_{\alpha_i,\bar\alpha_i}(z_i)\right\rangle
\propto
\prod_{i<j} (z_i-z_j)^{-2\alpha_i\alpha_j} (\bar z_i-\bar z_j)^{-2\bar \alpha_i\bar \alpha_j}$$

Single-valuedness of correlation functions leads to constraints on momentums,

$$\Delta(\alpha_i) -\Delta(\bar \alpha_i) \in \frac12\mathbb{Z}$$

== Models ==
=== Non-compact free bosons ===
A free bosonic CFT is called non-compact if the momentum can take continuous values.

Non-compact free bosonic CFTs with $Q\neq 0$ are used for describing non-critical string theory. In this context, a non-compact free bosonic CFT is called a linear dilaton theory.

A free bosonic CFT with $Q=0$ i.e. $c=1$ is a sigma model with a one-dimensional target space.

- If the target space is the Euclidean real line, then the momentum is imaginary $\alpha=\bar\alpha\in i\mathbb{R}$, and the conformal dimension is positive $\Delta(\alpha)\geq 0$.
- If the target space is the Minkowskian real line, then the momentum is real $\alpha=\bar\alpha\in \mathbb{R}$, and the conformal dimension is negative $\Delta(\alpha)\leq 0$.
- If the target space is a circle, then the momentum takes discrete values, and we have a compactified free boson.

=== Compactified free bosons ===
The compactified free boson with radius $R$ is the free bosonic CFT where the left and right momentums take the values

$$(\alpha,\bar \alpha) =\left(\frac{i}{2}\left[\frac{n}{R}+Rw\right], \frac{i}{2}\left[\frac{n}{R}-Rw\right]\right) \quad \text{with} \quad (n,w)\in\mathbb{Z}^2$$

The integers $n,w$ are then called the momentum and winding number. The allowed values of the compactification radius are $R\in\mathbb{C}^*$ if $Q=0$ and $R\in\frac{1}{iQ}\mathbb{Z}$ otherwise.

If $Q=0$, free bosons with radiuses $R$ and $\frac{1}{R}$ describe the same CFT. From a sigma model point of view, this equivalence is called T-duality.

If $Q=0$, the compactified free boson CFT exists on any Riemann surface. Its partition function on the torus $\frac{\mathbb{C}}{\mathbb{Z}+\tau\mathbb{Z}}$ is

$$Z_R(\tau) = Z_{\frac{1}{R}}(\tau) = \frac{1}{|\eta(\tau)|^2} \sum_{n,w\in\mathbb{Z}} q^{\frac14\left[\frac{n}{R}+Rw\right]^2} \bar{q}^{\frac14\left[\frac{n}{R}-Rw\right]^2}$$

where $q=e^{2\pi i\tau}$, and $\eta(\tau)$ is the Dedekind eta-function. This partition function is the sum of characters of the Virasoro algebra over the theory's spectrum of conformal dimensions.

As in all free bosonic CFTs, correlation functions of affine primary fields have a dependence on the fields' positions that is determined by the affine symmetry. The remaining constant factors are signs that depend on the fields' momentums and winding numbers.

== Boundary conditions in the case c=1 ==
=== Neumann and Dirichlet boundary conditions ===
Due to the $\mathbb{Z}_2$ automorphism $J\to -J$ of the abelian affine Lie algebra there are two types of boundary conditions that preserve the affine symmetry, namely

$$J = \bar{J} \quad \text{or} \quad J = -\bar{J}$$

If the boundary is the line $z=\bar{z}$, these conditions correspond respectively to the Neumann boundary condition and Dirichlet boundary condition for the free boson $\phi$.

=== Boundary states ===
In the case of a compactified free boson, each type of boundary condition leads to a family of boundary states, parametrized by $\theta\in \frac{\mathbb{R}}{2\pi \mathbb{Z}}$. The corresponding one-point functions on the upper half-plane $\{\Im z > 0\}$ are

$$\begin{align}
\left\langle V_{(n,w)}(z)\right\rangle_{\text{Dirichlet}, \theta} &= \frac{e^{in\theta}\delta_{w,0}}{|z-\bar z|^{\frac{n^2}{2R^2}}}
\\
\left\langle V_{(n,w)}(z)\right\rangle_{\text{Neumann}, \theta} &= \frac{e^{iw\theta}\delta_{n,0}}{|z-\bar z|^{\frac{R^2w^2}{2}}}
\end{align}$$

In the case of a non-compact free boson, there is only one Neumann boundary state, while Dirichlet boundary states are parametrized by a real parameter. The corresponding one-point functions are

$$\begin{align}
\left\langle V_{\alpha}(z)\right\rangle_{\text{Dirichlet}, \theta} &= \frac{e^{\alpha\theta}}{|z-\bar z|^{2\Delta(\alpha)} }
\\
\left\langle V_{\alpha}(z)\right\rangle_{\text{Neumann}} &= \delta(i\alpha)
\end{align}$$

where $\alpha\in i\mathbb{R}$ and $\theta\in\mathbb{R}$ for a Euclidean boson.

=== Conformal boundary conditions ===
Neumann and Dirichlet boundaries are the only boundaries that preserve the free boson's affine symmetry. However, there exist additional boundaries that preserve only the conformal symmetry.

- If the radius is irrational, there are additional boundary states, parametrized by a number $x\in [-1,1]$. The one-point functions of affine primary fields with $(n,w)\neq (0,0)$ vanish. However, the Virasoro primary fields that are affine descendants of the affine primary field with $(n,w)=(0,0)$ have nontrivial one-point functions.
- If the radius is rational $R=\frac{p}{q}$, the additional boundary states are parametrized by the manifold $\frac{SU(2)}{\mathbb{Z}_p\times \mathbb{Z}_q}$.
- For a non-compact boson, all unitary boundary conditions are known. Their moduli space is an open disc, with the Neumann boundary at the center, plus the line of Dirichlet boundaries.

Conformal boundary conditions at arbitrary $c$ were also studied under the misnomer "boundary Liouville theory".

== Related theories and generalizations ==
=== Multiple bosons and orbifolds ===
From $N$ massless free scalar bosons, it is possible to build a product CFT with the symmetry algebra $\hat{\mathfrak{u}}_1^N$. Some or all of the bosons can be compactified.

In particular, compactifying $N$ bosons without background charge on an $N$-dimensional torus (with Neveu–Schwarz B-field) gives rise to a family of CFTs called Narain compactifications. These CFTs exist on any Riemann surface, and play an important role in perturbative string theory.

Due to the existence of the automorphism $J\to -J$ of the affine Lie algebra $\hat{\mathfrak{u}}_1$, and of more general automorphisms of $\hat{\mathfrak{u}}_1^N$, there exist orbifolds of free bosonic CFTs. For example, the $\mathbb{Z}_2$ orbifold of the compactified free boson with $Q=0$ is the critical two-dimensional Ashkin–Teller model.

=== Coulomb gas formalism ===
The Coulomb gas formalism is a technique for building interacting CFTs, or some of their correlation functions, from free bosonic CFTs. The idea is to perturb the free CFT using screening operators of the form $\textstyle{\int} d^2z\, O(z)$, where $O(z)$ is an affine primary field of conformal dimensions $(\Delta,\bar\Delta) = (1, 1)$. In spite of its perturbative definition, the technique leads to exact results, thanks to momentum conservation.

In the case of a single free boson with background charge $Q$, there exist two diagonal screening operators $\textstyle{\int} V_b, \textstyle{\int} V_{b^{-1}}$, where $Q=b+b^{-1}$. Correlation functions in minimal models can be computed using these screening operators, giving rise to Dotsenko–Fateev integrals. Residues of correlation functions in Liouville theory can also be computed, and this led to the original derivation of the DOZZ formula for the three-point structure constant.

In the case of $N$ free bosons, the introduction of screening charges can be used for defining nontrivial CFTs including conformal Toda theory. The symmetries of these nontrivial CFTs are described by subalgebras of the abelian affine Lie algebra. Depending on the screenings, these subalgebras may or may not be W-algebras.

The Coulomb gas formalism can also be used in two-dimensional CFTs such as the q-state Potts model and the $O(n)$ model.

=== Various generalizations ===
In arbitrary dimensions, there exist conformal field theories called generalized free theories. These are however not generalizations of the free bosonic CFTs in two dimensions. In the former, it is the conformal dimension which is conserved (modulo integers). In the latter, it is the momentum.

In two dimensions, generalizations include:

- Massless free fermions.
- Ghost CFTs.
- Supersymmetric free CFTs.
