= Einstein–Weyl geometry =

An Einstein–Weyl geometry is a smooth conformal manifold, together with a compatible Weyl connection that satisfies an appropriate version of the Einstein vacuum equations, first considered by Cartan (1943) and named after Albert Einstein and Hermann Weyl. Specifically, if $M$ is a manifold with a conformal metric $[g]$, then a Weyl connection is by definition a torsion-free affine connection $\nabla$ such that
$$\nabla g = \alpha\otimes g$$
where $\alpha$ is a one-form.

The curvature tensor is defined in the usual manner by
$$R(X,Y)Z = (\nabla_X\nabla_Y - \nabla_Y\nabla_X - \nabla_{[X,Y]})Z,$$
and the Ricci curvature is
$$Rc(Y,Z) = \operatorname{tr}(X\mapsto R(X,Y)Z).$$
The Ricci curvature for a Weyl connection may fail to be symmetric (its skew part is essentially the exterior derivative of $\alpha$.)

An Einstein–Weyl geometry is then one for which the symmetric part of the Ricci curvature is a multiple of the metric, by an arbitrary smooth function:
$$Rc(X,Y) + Rc(Y,X) = f\,g(X,Y).$$

The global analysis of Einstein–Weyl geometries is generally more subtle than that of conformal geometry. For example, the Einstein cylinder is a global static conformal structure, but only one period of the cylinder (with the conformal structure of the de Sitter metric) is Einstein–Weyl.
