= Weyl connection =

Generalization of the Levi-Civita connection

In differential geometry, a Weyl connection (also called a Weyl structure) is a generalization of the Levi-Civita connection that makes sense on a conformal manifold. They were introduced by Hermann Weyl (Weyl 1918) in an attempt to unify general relativity and electromagnetism. His approach, although it did not lead to a successful theory, lead to further developments of the theory in conformal geometry, including a detailed study by Élie Cartan (Cartan 1943). They were also discussed in Eisenhart (1927).

Specifically, let $M$ be a smooth manifold, and $[g]$ a conformal class of (non-degenerate) metric tensors on $M$, where $h,g\in[g]$ iff $h=e^{2\gamma}g$ for some smooth function $\gamma$ (see Weyl transformation). A Weyl connection is a torsion free affine connection on $M$ such that, for any $g\in [g]$,
$$\nabla g = \alpha_g \otimes g$$
where $\alpha_g$ is a one-form depending on $g$.

If $\nabla$ is a Weyl connection and $h=e^{2\gamma}g$, then $\nabla h = (2\,d\gamma+\alpha_g)\otimes h$ so the one-form transforms by $\alpha_{e^{2\gamma}g} = 2\,d\gamma+\alpha_g.$ Thus the notion of a Weyl connection is conformally invariant, and the change in one-form is mediated by a de Rham cocycle.

An example of a Weyl connection is the Levi-Civita connection for any metric in the conformal class $[g]$, with $\alpha_g=0$. This is not the most general case, however, as any such Weyl connection has the property that the one-form $\alpha_h$ is closed for all $h$ belonging to the conformal class. In general, the Ricci curvature of a Weyl connection is not symmetric. Its skew part is the dimension times the two-form $d\alpha_g$, which is independent of $g$ in the conformal class, because the difference between two $\alpha_g$ is a de Rham cocycle. Thus, by the Poincaré lemma, the Ricci curvature is symmetric if and only if the Weyl connection is locally the Levi-Civita connection of some element of the conformal class.

Weyl's original hope was that the form $\alpha_g$ could represent the vector potential of electromagnetism (a gauge dependent quantity), and $d\alpha_g$ the field strength (a gauge invariant quantity). This synthesis is unsuccessful in part because the gauge group is wrong: electromagnetism is associated with a $U(1)$ gauge field, not an $\mathbb R$ gauge field.

Hall (1992) showed that an affine connection is a Weyl connection if and only if its holonomy group is a subgroup of the conformal group. The possible holonomy algebras in Lorentzian signature were analyzed in Dikarev (2021).

A Weyl manifold is a manifold admitting a global Weyl connection. The global analysis of Weyl manifolds is actively being studied. For example, LeBrun & Mason (2009) considered complete Weyl manifolds such that the Einstein vacuum equations hold, an Einstein–Weyl geometry, obtaining a complete characterization in three dimensions.

Weyl connections also have current applications in string theory and holography.

Weyl connections have been generalized to the setting of parabolic geometries, of which conformal geometry is a special case, in Čap & Slovák (2003).

== See also ==
- Einstein–Weyl geometry
