= Conformal anomaly =

Breakdown of conformal symmetry at the quantum level

A conformal anomaly, scale anomaly, trace anomaly or Weyl anomaly is an anomaly, i.e. a quantum phenomenon that breaks the conformal symmetry of the classical theory.

In quantum field theory when we set Planck constant $\hbar$ to zero we have only Feynman tree diagrams, which is a "classical" theory (equivalent to the Fredholm theory of a classical field theory). One-loop (N-loop) Feynman diagrams are proportional to $\hbar$ ($\hbar^N$). If a current is conserved classically ($\hbar=0$) but develops a divergence at loop level in quantum field theory ($\propto \hbar$), we say there is an anomaly. A famous example is the axial current anomaly where massless fermions will have a classically conserved axial current, but which develops a nonzero divergence in the presence of gauge fields.

A scale invariant theory, one in which there are no mass scales, will have a conserved Noether current called the "scale current." This is derived by performing scale transformations on the coordinates of space-time. The divergence of the scale current is then the trace of the stress tensor. In the absence of any mass scales the stress tensor trace vanishes ($\hbar=0$), hence the current is "classically conserved" and the theory is classically scale invariant. However, at loop level the scale current can develop a nonzero divergence. This is called the "scale anomaly" or "trace anomaly" and represents the generation of mass by quantum mechanics. It is related to the renormalization group, or the "running of coupling constants," when they are viewed at different mass scales.

While this can be formulated without reference to gravity, it becomes more powerful when general relativity is considered. A classically conformal theory with arbitrary background metric has an action that is invariant under rescalings of the background metric and other matter fields, called Weyl transformations. Note that if we rescale the coordinates this is a general coordinate transformation, and merges with general covariance, the exact symmetry of general relativity, and thus it becomes an unsatisfactory way to formulate scale symmetry (general covariance implies a conserved stress tensor; a "gravitational anomaly" represents a quantum breakdown of general covariance, and should not be confused with Weyl (scale) invariance).

However, under Weyl transformations we do not rescale the coordinates of the theory, but rather the metric and other matter fields. In the sense of Weyl, mass (or length) are defined by the metric, and coordinates are simply scale-less book-keeping devices. Hence Weyl symmetry is the correct statement of scale symmetry when gravitation is incorporated and there will then be a conserved Weyl current. There is an extensive literature involving spontaneous breaking of Weyl symmetry in four dimensions, leading to a dynamically generate Planck mass together with inflation. These theories appear to be in good agreement with observational cosmology.

A conformal quantum theory is therefore one whose path integral, or partition function, is unchanged by rescaling the metric (together with other fields). The variation of the action with respect to the background metric is proportional to the stress tensor, and therefore the variation with respect to a conformal rescaling is proportional to the trace of the stress tensor. As a result, the trace of the stress tensor must vanish for a conformally invariant theory. The trace of the stress tensor appears in the divergence of the Weyl current as an anomaly, thus breaking the Weyl (or Scale) invariance of the theory.

== Quantum chromodynamics ==
In quantum chromodynamics in the chiral limit, the classical theory has no mass scale so there is a conformal symmetry. Naively, we would expect that the proton is nearly massless because the quark kinetic energy and potential energy cancel by the relativistic virial theorem. However, in the quantum case the symmetry is broken by a conformal anomaly. This introduces a scale, the scale at which colour confinement occurs and determines the masses of hadrons, and the phenomenon of chiral symmetry breaking. Beside the anomaly (believed to contribute to about 20% of the proton mass), the rest can be attributed to the light quarks sigma terms (i.e., the fact that quark have small non-zero masses that are not associated with the trace anomaly) believed to contribute to about 17%, and the quark and gluon energies believed to contribute to about 29% and 34% of the proton mass, respectively. Hence QCD, via the trace anomaly, quark and gluon energies and sigma terms, is responsible for more than 99% of the mass of ordinary matter in the Universe, the Higgs mechanism directly contributing only less than one percent via mostly the u quark, d quark and electron masses.

== Coleman–Weinberg potentials ==
Sidney Coleman and Erick Weinberg showed how spontaneous symmetry breaking of electroweak interactions involving a fundamental Higgs scalar could occur via Feynmans loops. Moreover, the authors showed how to "improve" the results of their calculation using the renormalization group. In fact, the Coleman–Weinberg mechanism can be traced entirely to the renormalization group running of the quartic Higgs coupling, $\lambda$. The resulting Coleman–Weinberg potential is proportional to the associated $\beta$-function, while the trace anomaly is given by $\beta(\lambda)/\lambda$, hence the Coleman–Weinberg potential can be viewed as arising directly from the trace anomaly.

It has been conjectured that all mass in nature is generated by trace anomalies, hence by quantum mechanics alone.

== String theory ==
String theory is not classically scale invariant since it is defined with a massive "string constant". In string theory, conformal symmetry on the worldsheet is a local Weyl symmetry. There is also a potential gravitational anomaly in two dimensions and this anomaly must therefore cancel if the theory is to be consistent. The required cancellation of the gravitational anomaly implies that the spacetime dimensionality must be equal to the critical dimension which is either 26 in the case of bosonic string theory or 10 in the case of superstring theory. This case is called critical string theory.

There are alternative approaches known as non-critical string theory in which the space-time dimensions can be less than 26 for the bosonic theory or less than 10 for the superstring i.e. the four-dimensional case is plausible within this context. However, some intuitive postulates like flat space being a valid background, need to be given up.

== See also ==
- Anomaly (physics)
- Charge (physics)
- Central charge
- Anomalous scaling dimension
- Dimensional transmutation
