= Minimal model (physics) =

Family of solved 2D conformal field theories

In theoretical physics, a minimal model or Virasoro minimal model is a two-dimensional conformal field theory whose spectrum is built from finitely many irreducible representations of the Virasoro algebra. Minimal models have been classified, giving rise to an ADE classification. Most minimal models have been solved, i.e. their 3-point structure constants have been computed analytically. The term minimal model can also refer to a rational CFT based on an algebra that is larger than the Virasoro algebra, such as a W-algebra.

== Relevant representations of the Virasoro algebra ==
=== Representations ===
In minimal models, the central charge of the Virasoro algebra takes values of the type

$$c_{p,q} = 1 - 6 {(p-q)^2 \over pq}\ .$$

where $p, q$ are coprime integers such that $p,q \geq 2$. Then the conformal dimensions of degenerate representations are

$$h_{r,s} = \frac{(pr-qs)^2-(p-q)^2}{4pq}\ , \quad \text{with}\ r,s\in\mathbb{N}^*\ ,$$

and they obey the identities

$$h_{r,s} = h_{q-r,p-s} = h_{r+q,s+p}\ .$$

The spectra of minimal models are made of irreducible, degenerate lowest-weight representations of the Virasoro algebra, whose conformal dimensions are of the type $h_{r,s}$ with

$$1\leq r \leq q-1 \quad , \quad 1\leq s \leq p-1\ .$$

Such a representation $\mathcal{R}_{r,s}$ is a coset of a Verma module by its infinitely many nontrivial submodules. It is unitary if and only if $|p-q|=1$. At a given central charge, there are $\frac12(p-1)(q-1)$ distinct representations of this type. The set of these representations, or of their conformal dimensions, is called the Kac table with parameters $(p, q)$. The Kac table is usually drawn as a rectangle of size $(q-1)\times (p-1)$, where each representation appears twice due to the relation

$$\mathcal{R}_{r,s} = \mathcal{R}_{q-r,p-s}\ .$$

=== Fusion rules ===
The fusion rules of the multiply degenerate representations $\mathcal{R}_{r,s}$ encode constraints from all their null vectors. They can therefore be deduced from the fusion rules of simply degenerate representations, which encode constraints from individual null vectors. Explicitly, the fusion rules are

$$\mathcal{R}_{r_1,s_1} \times \mathcal{R}_{r_2,s_2} = \sum_{r_3\overset{2}{=}|r_1-r_2|+1}^{\min(r_1+r_2,2q-r_1-r_2)-1}\ \sum_{s_3\overset{2}{=}|s_1-s_2|+1}^{\min(s_1+s_2,2p-s_1-s_2)-1} \mathcal{R}_{r_3,s_3}\ ,$$

where the sums run by increments of two.

== Classification and spectra ==
Minimal models are the only 2d CFTs that are consistent on any Riemann surface, and are built from finitely many representations of the Virasoro algebra. There are many more rational CFTs that are consistent on the sphere only: these CFTs are submodels of minimal models, built from subsets of the Kac table that are closed under fusion. Such submodels can also be classified.

=== A-series minimal models: the diagonal case ===
For any coprime integers $p,q$ such that $p,q\geq 2$, there exists a diagonal minimal model whose spectrum contains one copy of each distinct representation in the Kac table:

$$\mathcal{S}_{p,q}^\text{A-series} = \frac12 \bigoplus_{r=1}^{q-1}\bigoplus_{s=1}^{p-1} \mathcal{R}_{r,s}\otimes \bar{\mathcal{R}}_{r,s}\ .$$

The $(p,q)$ and $(q,p)$ models are the same.

The OPE of two fields involves all the fields that are allowed by the fusion rules of the corresponding representations.

=== D-series minimal models ===
A D-series minimal model with the central charge $c_{p,q}$ exists if $p$ or $q$ is even and at least $6$. Using the symmetry $p\leftrightarrow q$ we assume that $q$ is even, then $p$ is odd. The spectrum is

$$\mathcal{S}_{p,q}^{\text{D-series}} \ \ \underset{q\equiv 0\operatorname{mod} 4,\  q\geq 8}{=}\ \ \frac12 \bigoplus_{r\overset{2}{=}1}^{q-1} \bigoplus_{s=1}^{p-1} \mathcal{R}_{ r,s} \otimes \bar{\mathcal{R}}_{r,s}\oplus \frac12\bigoplus_{r\overset{2}{=}2}^{q-2} \bigoplus_{s=1}^{p-1} \mathcal{R}_{r,s} \otimes \bar{\mathcal{R}}_{q-r,s}\ ,$$
$$\mathcal{S}_{p,q}^{\text{D-series}} \ \ \underset{q\equiv 2\operatorname{mod} 4,\ q\geq 6}{=}\ \ \frac12 \bigoplus_{r\overset{2}{=}1}^{q-1} \bigoplus_{s=1}^{p-1} \mathcal{R}_{ r,s} \otimes \bar{\mathcal{R}}_{r,s}\oplus \frac12\bigoplus_{r\overset{2}{=}1}^{q-1} \bigoplus_{s=1}^{p-1} \mathcal{R}_{r,s} \otimes \bar{\mathcal{R}}_{q-r,s}\ ,$$

where the sums over $r$ run by increments of two. In any given spectrum, each representation has multiplicity one, except the representations of the type $\mathcal{R}_{\frac{q}{2},s}\otimes \bar{\mathcal{R}}_{\frac{q}{2},s}$ if $q\equiv 2\ \mathrm{mod}\ 4$, which have multiplicity two. These representations indeed appear in both terms in our formula for the spectrum.

The OPE of two fields involves all the fields that are allowed by the fusion rules of the corresponding representations, and that respect the conservation of diagonality: the OPE of one diagonal and one non-diagonal field yields only non-diagonal fields, and the OPE of two fields of the same type yields only diagonal fields. For this rule, one copy of the representation $\mathcal{R}_{\frac{q}{2},s}\otimes \bar{\mathcal{R}}_{\frac{q}{2},s}$ counts as diagonal, and the other copy as non-diagonal.

=== E-series minimal models ===
There are three series of E-series minimal models. Each series exists for a given value of $q\in\{12,18,30\},$ for any $p\geq 2$ that is coprime with $q$. (This actually implies $p\geq 5$.) Using the notation $|\mathcal{R}|^2 = \mathcal{R}\otimes \bar{\mathcal{R}}$, the spectra read:

$$\mathcal{S}^\text{E-series}_{p,12} = \frac12 \bigoplus_{s=1}^{p-1} \left\{
\left| \mathcal{R}_{1,s}\oplus \mathcal{R}_{7,s}\right|^2
\oplus \left| \mathcal{R}_{4,s} \oplus \mathcal{R}_{8,s}\right|^2
\oplus \left| \mathcal{R}_{5,s} \oplus \mathcal{R}_{11,s} \right|^2
\right\}\ ,$$
$$\mathcal{S}^\text{E-series}_{p,18} = \frac12 \bigoplus_{s=1}^{p-1} \left\{ \left|\mathcal{R}_{9,s}\oplus 2\mathcal{R}_{3,s}\right|^2 \ominus 4\left|\mathcal{R}_{3,s}\right|^2 \oplus \bigoplus_{r\in\{1, 5, 7\}} \left|\mathcal{R}_{r,s}\oplus \mathcal{R}_{18-r,s}\right|^2 \right\}\ ,$$
$$\mathcal{S}^\text{E-series}_{p,30} = \frac12 \bigoplus_{s=1}^{p-1} \left\{
\left|\bigoplus_{r\in\{1,11,19,29\}} \mathcal{R}_{r,s}\right|^2 \oplus
\left|\bigoplus_{r\in\{7,13,17,23\}} \mathcal{R}_{r,s}\right|^2
\right\}\ .$$

== Examples ==
The following A-series minimal models are related to well-known physical systems:

- $(p,q)=(3,2)$ : trivial CFT,
- $(p,q)=(5,2)$ : Yang-Lee edge singularity,
- $(p,q)=(4,3)$ : critical Ising model,
- $(p,q)=(5,4)$ : tricritical Ising model,
- $(p,q)=(6,5)$ : tetracritical Ising model.

The following D-series minimal models are related to well-known physical systems:

- $(p,q)=(6,5)$ : 3-state Potts model at criticality,
- $(p,q)=(7,6)$ : tricritical 3-state Potts model.

The Kac tables of these models, together with a few other Kac tables with $2\leq q \leq 6$, are:

$$\begin{array}{c}\begin{array}{c|cc} 1 & 0 & 0 \\  \hline & 1 & 2 \end{array}\\ c_{3,2}=0 \end{array}
\qquad
\begin{array}{c}\begin{array}{c|cccc} 1 & 0 & - \frac{1}{5} & - \frac{1}{5} & 0 \\  \hline & 1 & 2 & 3 & 4 \end{array}\\ c_{5,2}=- \frac{22}{5} \end{array}$$
$$\begin{array}{c}\begin{array}{c|ccc} 2 & \frac{1}{2} & \frac{1}{16} & 0 \\ 1 & 0 & \frac{1}{16} & \frac{1}{2} \\  \hline & 1 & 2 & 3 \end{array}\\ c_{4,3}=\frac{1}{2} \end{array}
\qquad
\begin{array}{c}\begin{array}{c|cccc} 2 & \frac{3}{4} & \frac{1}{5} & - \frac{1}{20} & 0 \\ 1 & 0 & - \frac{1}{20} & \frac{1}{5} & \frac{3}{4} \\  \hline & 1 & 2 & 3 & 4 \end{array}\\ c_{5,3}=- \frac{3}{5} \end{array}$$
$$\begin{array}{c}\begin{array}{c|cccc} 3 & \frac{3}{2} & \frac{3}{5} & \frac{1}{10} & 0 \\ 2 & \frac{7}{16} & \frac{3}{80} & \frac{3}{80} & \frac{7}{16} \\ 1 & 0 & \frac{1}{10} & \frac{3}{5} & \frac{3}{2} \\  \hline & 1 & 2 & 3 & 4 \end{array}\\ c_{5,4}=\frac{7}{10} \end{array}
\qquad
\begin{array}{c}\begin{array}{c|cccccc} 3 & \frac{5}{2} & \frac{10}{7} & \frac{9}{14} & \frac{1}{7} & - \frac{1}{14} & 0 \\ 2 & \frac{13}{16} & \frac{27}{112} & - \frac{5}{112} & - \frac{5}{112} & \frac{27}{112} & \frac{13}{16} \\ 1 & 0 & - \frac{1}{14} & \frac{1}{7} & \frac{9}{14} & \frac{10}{7} & \frac{5}{2} \\  \hline & 1 & 2 & 3 & 4 & 5 & 6 \end{array}\\ c_{7,4}=- \frac{13}{14} \end{array}$$
$$\begin{array}{c}\begin{array}{c|ccccc} 4 & 3 & \frac{13}{8} & \frac{2}{3} & \frac{1}{8} & 0 \\ 3 & \frac{7}{5} & \frac{21}{40} & \frac{1}{15} & \frac{1}{40} & \frac{2}{5} \\ 2 & \frac{2}{5} & \frac{1}{40} & \frac{1}{15} & \frac{21}{40} & \frac{7}{5} \\ 1 & 0 & \frac{1}{8} & \frac{2}{3} & \frac{13}{8} & 3 \\  \hline & 1 & 2 & 3 & 4 & 5 \end{array}\\ c_{6,5}=\frac{4}{5} \end{array}
\qquad
\begin{array}{c}\begin{array}{c|cccccc} 4 & \frac{15}{4} & \frac{16}{7} & \frac{33}{28} & \frac{3}{7} & \frac{1}{28} & 0 \\ 3 & \frac{9}{5} & \frac{117}{140} & \frac{8}{35} & - \frac{3}{140} & \frac{3}{35} & \frac{11}{20} \\ 2 & \frac{11}{20} & \frac{3}{35} & - \frac{3}{140} & \frac{8}{35} & \frac{117}{140} & \frac{9}{5} \\ 1 & 0 & \frac{1}{28} & \frac{3}{7} & \frac{33}{28} & \frac{16}{7} & \frac{15}{4} \\  \hline & 1 & 2 & 3 & 4 & 5 & 6 \end{array}\\ c_{7,5}=\frac{11}{35} \end{array}$$
$$\begin{array}{c}\begin{array}{c|cccccc} 5 & 5 & \frac{22}{7} & \frac{12}{7} & \frac{5}{7} & \frac{1}{7} & 0 \\ 4 & \frac{23}{8} & \frac{85}{56} & \frac{33}{56} & \frac{5}{56} & \frac{1}{56} & \frac{3}{8} \\ 3 & \frac{4}{3} & \frac{10}{21} & \frac{1}{21} & \frac{1}{21} & \frac{10}{21} & \frac{4}{3} \\ 2 & \frac{3}{8} & \frac{1}{56} & \frac{5}{56} & \frac{33}{56} & \frac{85}{56} & \frac{23}{8} \\ 1 & 0 & \frac{1}{7} & \frac{5}{7} & \frac{12}{7} & \frac{22}{7} & 5 \\  \hline & 1 & 2 & 3 & 4 & 5 & 6 \end{array}\\ c_{7,6}=\frac{6}{7} \end{array}$$

== Solution of minimal models ==
The 3-point structure constants of minimal models take different forms depending on the series:

- For A-series minimal models, an expression in terms of the Gamma function was obtained using Coulomb gas techniques in the 1980s.
- For D-series minimal models, an expression in terms of the fusing matrix is known.
- For E-series minimal models, an expression in terms of the Gamma function was obtained using numerical bootstrap techniques.
- Compact expressions of structure constants in terms of the double Gamma function are known for the A-series and D-series minimal models, as well as for E-series minimal models with $q=12$.

== Related conformal field theories ==
=== Coset realizations ===
The A-series minimal model with indices $(p,q)$ coincides with the following coset of WZW models:

$$\frac{SU(2)_k\times SU(2)_1}{SU(2)_{k+1}}\ , \quad \text{where} \quad k = \frac{q}{p-q}-2\ .$$

Assuming $p>q$, the level $k$ is integer if and only if $p=q+1$ i.e. if and only if the minimal model is unitary.

There exist other realizations of certain minimal models, diagonal or not, as cosets of WZW models, not necessarily based on the group $SU(2)$.

=== Generalized minimal models ===
For any central charge $c\in\mathbb{C}$, there is a diagonal CFT whose spectrum is made of all degenerate representations,

$$\mathcal{S}=\bigoplus_{r,s=1}^\infty \mathcal{R}_{r,s}\otimes \bar{\mathcal{R}}_{r,s} \ .$$

When the central charge tends to $c_{p,q}$, the generalized minimal models tend to the corresponding A-series minimal model. This means in particular that the degenerate representations that are not in the Kac table decouple.

=== Liouville theory ===
Since Liouville theory reduces to a generalized minimal model when the fields are taken to be degenerate, it further reduces to an A-series minimal model when the central charge is then sent to $c_{p,q}$.

Moreover, A-series minimal models have a well-defined limit as $c\to 1$: a diagonal CFT with a continuous spectrum called Runkel–Watts theory, which coincides with the limit of Liouville theory when $c\to 1^+$.

=== Products of minimal models ===
There are three cases of minimal models that are products of two minimal models. At the level of their spectra, the relations are:

$$\mathcal{S}^\text{A-series}_{2,5}\otimes \mathcal{S}^\text{A-series}_{2,5} = \mathcal{S}^\text{D-series}_{3,10}\ ,$$
$$\mathcal{S}^\text{A-series}_{2,5}\otimes \mathcal{S}^\text{A-series}_{3,4} =
\mathcal{S}^\text{E-series}_{5,12} \ ,$$
$$\mathcal{S}^\text{A-series}_{2,5}\otimes \mathcal{S}^\text{A-series}_{2,7} =
\mathcal{S}^\text{E-series}_{7,30} \ .$$

=== Fermionic extensions of minimal models ===
If $q\equiv 0\bmod 4$, the A-series and the D-series $(p,q)$ minimal models each have a fermionic extension. These two fermionic extensions involve fields with half-integer spins, and they are related to one another by a parity-shift operation.
