= Worldsheet =

Mathematical concept

In string theory, a worldsheet is a two-dimensional manifold which describes the embedding of a string in spacetime. The term was coined by Leonard Susskind as a direct generalization of the world line concept for a point particle in special and general relativity.

The type of string, the geometry of the spacetime in which it propagates, and the presence of long-range background fields (such as gauge fields) are encoded in a two-dimensional conformal field theory defined on the worldsheet. For example, the bosonic string in 26 dimensions has a worldsheet conformal field theory consisting of 26 free scalar bosons. Meanwhile, a superstring worldsheet theory in 10 dimensions consists of 10 free scalar fields and their fermionic superpartners.

== Mathematical formulation ==
=== Bosonic string ===
We begin with the classical formulation of the bosonic string.

First fix a $d$-dimensional flat spacetime ($d$-dimensional Minkowski space), $M$, which serves as the ambient space for the string.

A world-sheet $\Sigma$ is then an embedded surface, that is, an embedded 2-manifold $\Sigma \hookrightarrow M$, such that the induced metric has signature $(-,+)$ everywhere. Consequently it is possible to locally define coordinates $(\tau,\sigma)$ where $\tau$ is time-like while $\sigma$ is space-like.

Strings are further classified into open and closed. The topology of the worldsheet of an open string is $\mathbb{R}\times I$, where $I := [0,1]$, a closed interval, and admits a global coordinate chart $(\tau, \sigma)$ with $-\infty < \tau < \infty$ and $0 \leq \sigma \leq 1$.

Meanwhile the topology of the worldsheet of a closed string is $\mathbb{R}\times S^1$, and admits 'coordinates' $(\tau, \sigma)$ with $-\infty < \tau < \infty$ and $\sigma \in \mathbb{R}/2\pi\mathbb{Z}$. That is, $\sigma$ is a periodic coordinate with the identification $\sigma \sim \sigma + 2\pi$. The redundant description (using quotients) can be removed by choosing a representative $0 \leq \sigma < 2\pi$.

==== World-sheet metric ====
In order to define the Polyakov action, the world-sheet is equipped with a world-sheet metric $\mathbf{g}$, which also has signature $(-, +)$ but is independent of the induced metric.

Since Weyl transformations are considered a redundancy of the metric structure, the world-sheet is instead considered to be equipped with a conformal class of metrics $[\mathbf{g}]$. Then $(\Sigma, [\mathbf{g}])$ defines the data of a conformal manifold with signature $(-, +)$.
