= Toda field theory =

Special quantum field theory

In mathematics and physics, specifically the study of field theory and partial differential equations, a Toda field theory, named after Morikazu Toda, is specified by a choice of Lie algebra and a specific Lagrangian.

== Formulation ==
Fixing the Lie algebra to have rank $r$, that is, the Cartan subalgebra of the algebra has dimension $r$, the Lagrangian can be written

$$\mathcal{L}=\frac{1}{2}\left\langle \partial_\mu \phi, \partial^\mu \phi \right\rangle
-\frac{m^2}{\beta^2}\sum_{i=1}^r n_i \exp(\beta \langle\alpha_i, \phi\rangle).$$

The background spacetime is 2-dimensional Minkowski space, with space-like coordinate $x$ and timelike coordinate $t$. Greek indices indicate spacetime coordinates.

For some choice of root basis, $\alpha_i$ is the $i$th simple root. This provides a basis for the Cartan subalgebra, allowing it to be identified with $\mathbb{R}^r$.

Then the field content is a collection of $r$ scalar fields $\phi_i$, which are scalar in the sense that they transform trivially under Lorentz transformations of the underlying spacetime.

The inner product $\langle\cdot, \cdot\rangle$ is the restriction of the Killing form to the Cartan subalgebra.

The $n_i$ are integer constants, known as Kac labels or Dynkin labels.

The physical constants are the mass $m$ and the coupling constant $\beta$.

== Classification of Toda field theories ==
Toda field theories are classified according to their associated Lie algebra.

Toda field theories usually refer to theories with a finite Lie algebra. If the Lie algebra is an affine Lie algebra, it is called an affine Toda field theory (after the component of φ which decouples is removed). If it is hyperbolic, it is called a hyperbolic Toda field theory.

Toda field theories are integrable models and their solutions describe solitons.

== Examples ==
Liouville field theory is associated to the A_{1} Cartan matrix, which corresponds to the Lie algebra $\mathfrak{su}(2)$ in the classification of Lie algebras by Cartan matrices. The algebra $\mathfrak{su}(2)$ has only a single simple root.

The sinh-Gordon model is the affine Toda field theory with the generalized Cartan matrix

$$\begin{pmatrix} 2&-2 \\ -2&2 \end{pmatrix}$$

and a positive value for β after we project out a component of φ which decouples.

The sine-Gordon model is the model with the same Cartan matrix but an imaginary β. This Cartan matrix corresponds to the Lie algebra $\mathfrak{su}(2)$. This has a single simple root, $\alpha_1 = 1$ and Coxeter label $n_1 = 1$, but the Lagrangian is modified for the affine theory: there is also an affine root $\alpha_0 = -1$ and Coxeter label $n_0 = 1$. One can expand $\phi$ as $\phi_0 \alpha_0 + \phi_1 \alpha_1$, but for the affine root $\langle \alpha_0, \alpha_0 \rangle = 0$, so the $\phi_0$ component decouples.

The sum is $\sum_{i=0}^1 n_i\exp(\beta \alpha_i\phi) = \exp(\beta \phi) + \exp(-\beta\phi).$ Then if $\beta$ is purely imaginary, $\beta = ib$ with $b$ real and, without loss of generality, positive, then this is $2\cos(b\phi)$. The Lagrangian is then
$$\mathcal{L} = \frac{1}{2}\partial_\mu \phi \partial^\mu \phi + \frac{2m^2}{b^2}\cos(b\phi),$$
which is the sine-Gordon Lagrangian.
