= Weyl transformation =

Local rescaling of a metric tensor

In theoretical physics, the Weyl transformation, named after German mathematician Hermann Weyl, is a local rescaling of the metric tensor:

$g_{ab} \rightarrow e^{-2\omega(x)} g_{ab}$

which produces another metric in the same conformal class. A theory or an expression invariant under this transformation is called conformally invariant, or is said to possess Weyl invariance or Weyl symmetry. The Weyl symmetry is an important symmetry in conformal field theory. It is, for example, a symmetry of the Polyakov action. When quantum mechanical effects break the conformal invariance of a theory, it is said to exhibit a conformal anomaly or Weyl anomaly.

The ordinary Levi-Civita connection and associated spin connections are not invariant under Weyl transformations. Weyl connections are a class of affine connections that is invariant, although no Weyl connection is individual invariant under Weyl transformations.

== Conformal weight ==
A quantity $\varphi$ has conformal weight $k$ if, under the Weyl transformation, it transforms via

$$\varphi \to \varphi e^{k \omega}.$$

Thus conformally weighted quantities belong to certain density bundles; see also conformal dimension. Let $A_\mu$ be the connection one-form associated to the Levi-Civita connection of $g$. Introduce a connection that depends also on an initial one-form $\partial_\mu\omega$ via

$$B_\mu = A_\mu + \partial_\mu \omega.$$

Then $D_\mu \varphi \equiv \partial_\mu \varphi + k B_\mu \varphi$ is covariant and has conformal weight $k - 1$.

== Formulas ==
For the transformation

$$g_{ab} = f(\phi(x)) \bar{g}_{ab}$$

We can derive the following formulas

$$\begin{align}
g^{ab} &= \frac{1}{f(\phi(x))} \bar{g}^{ab}\\
\sqrt{-g} &= \sqrt{-\bar{g}} f^{D/2} \\
\Gamma^c_{ab} &= \bar{\Gamma}^c_{ab} + \frac{f'}{2f} \left(\delta^c_b \partial_a \phi + \delta^c_a \partial_b \phi - \bar{g}_{ab} \partial^c \phi \right) \equiv \bar{\Gamma}^c_{ab} + \gamma^c_{ab} \\
R_{ab} &= \bar{R}_{ab} + \frac{f'' f- f^{\prime 2}}{2f^2} \left((2-D) \partial_a \phi \partial_b \phi - \bar{g}_{ab} \partial^c \phi \partial_c \phi \right) + \frac{f'}{2f} \left((2-D) \bar{\nabla}_a \partial_b \phi - \bar{g}_{ab} \bar{\Box} \phi\right) + \frac{1}{4} \frac{f^{\prime 2}}{f^2} (D-2) \left(\partial_a \phi \partial_b \phi - \bar{g}_{ab} \partial_c \phi \partial^c \phi \right) \\
R &= \frac{1}{f} \bar{R} + \frac{1-D}{f} \left( \frac{f''f - f^{\prime 2}}{f^2} \partial^c \phi \partial_c \phi + \frac{f'}{f} \bar{\Box} \phi \right) + \frac{1}{4f} \frac{f^{\prime 2}}{f^2} (D-2) (1-D) \partial_c \phi \partial^c \phi
\end{align}$$

Note that the Weyl tensor is invariant under a Weyl rescaling.
