= Bosonic string theory =

26-dimensional string theory

Bosonic string theory is the original version of string theory, developed in the late 1960s. It is so called because it contains only bosons in the spectrum.

In the 1980s, supersymmetry was proposed in the context of string theory, and a new version of string theory called superstring theory (supersymmetric string theory) became the real focus. Nevertheless, bosonic string theory remains a very useful model to understand many general features of perturbative string theory, and many theoretical difficulties of superstrings can actually already be found in the context of bosonic strings.

== Problems ==
Although bosonic string theory has many attractive features, it falls short as a viable physical model in two significant areas.

First, it predicts only the existence of bosons whereas many physical particles are fermions.

Second, it predicts the existence of a mode of the string with imaginary mass, implying that the theory has an instability to a process known as "tachyon condensation".

In addition, bosonic string theory in a general spacetime dimension displays inconsistencies due to the conformal anomaly. But, as was first noticed by Claud Lovelace, in a spacetime of 26 dimensions (25 dimensions of space and one of time), the critical dimension for the theory, the anomaly cancels. This high dimensionality is not necessarily a problem for string theory, because it can be formulated in such a way that along the 22 excess dimensions spacetime is folded up to form a small torus or other compact manifold. This would leave only the familiar four dimensions of spacetime visible to low energy experiments. The existence of a critical dimension where the anomaly cancels is a general feature of all string theories.

== Types of bosonic strings ==
There are four possible bosonic string theories, depending on whether open strings are allowed and whether strings have a specified orientation. A theory of open strings must also include closed strings, because open strings can be thought of as having their endpoints fixed on a D25-brane that fills all of spacetime. A specific orientation of the string means that only interaction corresponding to an orientable worldsheet are allowed (e.g., two strings can only merge with equal orientation). A sketch of the spectra of the four possible theories is as follows:

Bosonic string theory	Non-positive $M^2$ states
Open and closed, oriented	tachyon, graviton, dilaton, massless antisymmetric tensor, U(1) vector boson
Open and closed, unoriented	tachyon, graviton, dilaton
Closed, oriented	tachyon, graviton, dilaton, antisymmetric tensor
Closed, unoriented	tachyon, graviton, dilaton

Note that all four theories have a negative energy tachyon ($M^2 = - \frac{1}{\alpha'}$) and a massless graviton.

The rest of this article applies to the closed, oriented theory, corresponding to borderless, orientable worldsheets.

== Mathematics ==
=== Path integral perturbation theory ===
Bosonic string theory can be said to be defined by the path integral quantization of the Polyakov action:

$$I_0[g,X] = \frac{T}{8\pi} \int_M d^2 \xi \sqrt{g} g^{mn} \partial_m x^\mu \partial_n x^\nu G_{\mu\nu}(x)$$

$x^\mu(\xi)$ is the field on the worldsheet describing the most embedding of the string in 25 +1 spacetime; in the Polyakov formulation, $g$ is not to be understood as the induced metric from the embedding, but as an independent dynamical field. $G$ is the metric on the target spacetime, which is usually taken to be the Minkowski metric in the perturbative theory. Under a Wick rotation, this is brought to a Euclidean metric $G_{\mu\nu} = \delta_{\mu\nu}$. M is the worldsheet as a topological manifold parametrized by the $\xi$ coordinates. $T$ is the string tension and related to the Regge slope as $T = \frac{1}{2\pi\alpha'}$.

$I_0$ has diffeomorphism and Weyl invariance. Weyl symmetry is broken upon quantization (Conformal anomaly) and therefore this action has to be supplemented with a counterterm, along with a hypothetical purely topological term, proportional to the Euler characteristic:

$$I = I_0 + \lambda \chi(M) + \mu_0^2 \int_M d^2\xi \sqrt{g}$$

The explicit breaking of Weyl invariance by the counterterm can be cancelled away in the critical dimension 26.

Physical quantities are then constructed from the (Euclidean) partition function and N-point function:

$$Z = \sum_{h=0}^\infty \int \frac{\mathcal{D}g_{mn} \mathcal{D}X^\mu}{\mathcal{N}} \exp ( - I[g,X] )$$
$$\left\langle V_{i_1} (k^\mu_1) \cdots V_{i_p}(k_p^\mu) \right\rangle = \sum_{h=0}^\infty \int \frac{\mathcal{D}g_{mn} \mathcal{D}X^\mu}{\mathcal{N}} \exp ( - I[g,X] ) V_{i_1} (k_1^\mu) \cdots V_{i_p} (k^\mu_p)$$

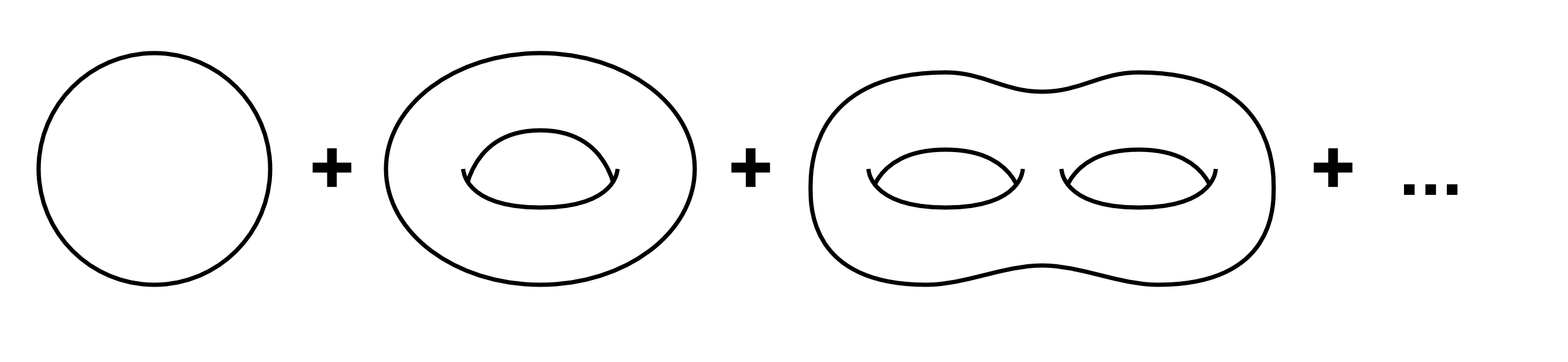
The perturbative series is expressed as a sum over topologies, indexed by the genus.

The discrete sum is a sum over possible topologies, which for euclidean bosonic orientable closed strings are compact orientable Riemannian surfaces and are thus identified by a genus $h$. A normalization factor $\mathcal{N}$ is introduced to compensate overcounting from symmetries. While the computation of the partition function corresponds to the cosmological constant, the N-point function, including $p$ vertex operators, describes the scattering amplitude of strings.

The symmetry group of the action actually reduces drastically the integration space to a finite dimensional manifold. The $g$ path-integral in the partition function is a priori a sum over possible Riemannian structures; however, quotienting with respect to Weyl transformations allows us to only consider conformal structures, that is, equivalence classes of metrics under the identifications of metrics related by

$$g'(\xi) = e^{\sigma(\xi)} g(\xi)$$

Since the world-sheet is two dimensional, there is a 1-1 correspondence between conformal structures and complex structures. One still has to quotient away diffeomorphisms. This leaves us with an integration over the space of all possible complex structures modulo diffeomorphisms, which is simply the moduli space of the given topological surface, and is in fact a finite-dimensional complex manifold. The fundamental problem of perturbative bosonic strings therefore becomes the parametrization of Moduli space, which is non-trivial for genus $h \geq 4$.

==== h = 0 ====
At tree-level, corresponding to genus 0, the cosmological constant vanishes: $Z_0 = 0$.

The four-point function for the scattering of four tachyons is the Shapiro-Virasoro amplitude:

$$A_4 \propto (2\pi)^{26} \delta^{26}(k) \frac{\Gamma(-1-s/2) \Gamma(-1-t/2) \Gamma(-1-u/2)}{\Gamma(2+s/2) \Gamma(2+t/2) \Gamma(2+u/2)}$$

Where $k$ is the total momentum and $s$, $t$, $u$ are the Mandelstam variables.

==== h = 1 ====
The shaded region is a possible fundamental domain for the modular group.

Genus 1 is the torus, and corresponds to the one-loop level. The partition function amounts to:

$$Z_1 = \int_{\mathcal{M}_1} \frac{d^2 \tau}{8\pi^2 \tau_2^2} \frac{1}{(4\pi^2 \tau_2)^{12}} \left| \eta(\tau) \right| ^{-48}$$

$\tau$ is a complex number with positive imaginary part $\tau_2$; $\mathcal{M}_1$, holomorphic to the moduli space of the torus, is any fundamental domain for the modular group $PSL(2,\mathbb{Z})$ acting on the upper half-plane, for example $\left\{ \tau_2 > 0, |\tau|^2 > 1, -\frac{1}{2} < \tau_1 < \frac{1}{2} \right\}$. $\eta(\tau)$ is the Dedekind eta function. The integrand is of course invariant under the modular group: the measure $\frac{d^2 \tau}{\tau_2^2}$ is simply the Poincaré metric which has PSL(2,R) as isometry group; the rest of the integrand is also invariant by virtue of $\tau_2 \rightarrow |c \tau + d|^2 \tau_2$ and the fact that $\eta(\tau)$ is a modular form of weight 1/2.

This integral diverges. This is due to the presence of the tachyon and is related to the instability of the perturbative vacuum.

== See also ==
- Nambu–Goto action
- Polyakov action
