= Central charge =

Commuting Lie algebra operator

In theoretical physics, a central charge is an operator Z that commutes with all the other symmetry operators. The adjective "central" refers to the center of the symmetry group—the subgroup of elements that commute with all other elements of the original group—often embedded within a Lie algebra. In some cases, such as two-dimensional conformal field theory, a central charge may also commute with all of the other operators, including operators that are not symmetry generators.

== Overview ==
More precisely, the central charge is the charge that corresponds, by Noether's theorem, to the center of the central extension of the symmetry group.

In theories with supersymmetry, this definition can be generalized to include supergroups and Lie superalgebras. A central charge is any operator which commutes with all the other supersymmetry generators. Theories with extended supersymmetry typically have many operators of this kind. In string theory, in the first quantized formalism, these operators also have the interpretation of winding numbers (topological quantum numbers) of various strings and branes.

In conformal field theory, the central charge is a c-number (commutes with every other operator) term that appears in the commutator of two components of the stress–energy tensor. As a result, conformal field theory is characterized by a representation of Virasoro algebra with central charge c.

== Gauss sums and higher central charge ==
For conformal field theories that are described by modular tensor category, the central charge can be extracted from the Gauss sum. In terms of anyon quantum dimension d_{a} and topological spin θ_{a} of anyon a, the Gauss sum is given by

$$\zeta_1 = \frac{\sum_a d^2_a \theta_a}{|{\sum_a d^2_a \theta_a}|},$$

and equals $e^{\frac{2\pi i}{8} c_-}$, where $c_-$ is central charge.

This definition allows extending the definition to a higher central charge, using the higher Gauss sums:

$$\zeta_n = \frac{\sum_a d^2_a \theta_a^n}{|{\sum_a d^2_a \theta_a^n}|}.$$

The vanishing higher central charge is a necessary condition for the topological quantum field theory to admit topological (gapped) boundary conditions.

== See also ==
- Charge (physics)
- Conformal anomaly
- Two-dimensional conformal field theory
- Vertex operator algebra
- W-algebra
- Virasoro algebra
- Lie algebra extension#Projective representation
- Group extension
- Representation theory of the Galilean group
- Non-critical string theory#The critical dimension and central charge
