= Primary field =

Type of local operator in conformal field theory

In theoretical physics, a primary field, also called a primary operator, or simply a primary, is a local operator in a conformal field theory which is annihilated by the part of the conformal algebra consisting of the lowering generators. From the representation theory point of view, a primary is the lowest dimension operator in a given representation of the conformal algebra. All other operators in a representation are called descendants; they can be obtained by acting on the primary with the raising generators.

== History of the concept ==
Primary fields in a D-dimensional conformal field theory were introduced in 1969 by Mack and Salam where they were called interpolating fields. They were then studied by Ferrara, Gatto, and Grillo who called them irreducible conformal tensors, and by Mack who called them lowest weights. Polyakov used an equivalent definition as fields which cannot be represented as derivatives of other fields.

The modern terms primary fields and descendants were introduced by Belavin, Polyakov and Zamolodchikov in the context of two-dimensional conformal field theory. This terminology is now used both for D=2 and D>2.

== Conformal field theory in D>2 spacetime dimensions ==
In $d>2$ dimensions conformal primary fields can be defined in two equivalent ways.

=== First definition ===
Let $\hat{D}$ be the generator of dilations and let $\hat{K}_{\mu}$ be the generator of special conformal transformations. A conformal primary field $\hat{\phi}^M_{\rho}(x)$, in the $\rho$ representation of the Lorentz group and with conformal dimension $\Delta$ satisfies the following conditions at $x=0$ :

1. $\left[\hat{D},\hat{\phi}^M_{\rho}(0)\right]=-i\Delta\hat{\phi}^M_{\rho}(0)$;
2. $\left[\hat{K}_{\mu},\hat{\phi}^M_{\rho}(0)\right]=0$.

=== Second definition ===
A conformal primary field $\hat{\phi}^M_{\rho}(x)$, in the $\rho$ representation of the Lorentz group and with conformal dimension $\Delta$, transforms under a conformal transformation $\eta_{\mu \nu}\mapsto \Omega^2(x)\eta_{\mu \nu}$ as

$$\hat{\phi'}^M_{\rho}(x')=\Omega^{\Delta}(x)\mathcal{D}{\left[R(x)\right]^M}_{N}\hat{\phi}^N_{\rho}(x)$$

where ${R^{\mu}}_{\nu}(x)=\Omega^{-1}(x)\frac{\partial x^{\mu}}{\partial x'^{\nu}}$ and $\mathcal{D}{\left[R(x)\right]^M}_{N}$ implements the action of $R$ in the $SO(d-1,1)$ representation of $\hat{\phi}^{M}_{\rho}(x)$.

== Conformal field theory in D=2 dimensions ==
In two dimensions, conformal field theories are invariant under an infinite dimensional Virasoro algebra with generators $L_n, \bar{L}_n, -\infty<n<\infty$. Primaries are defined as the operators annihilated by all $L_n, \bar{L}_n$ with n>0, which are the lowering generators. Descendants are obtained from the primaries by acting with $L_n, \bar{L}_n$ with n<0.

The Virasoro algebra has a finite dimensional subalgebra generated by $L_n, \bar{L}_n, -1\le n\le 1$. Operators annihilated by $L_1, \bar{L}_1$ are called quasi-primaries. Each primary field is a quasi-primary, but the converse is not true; in fact each primary has infinitely many quasi-primary descendants. Quasi-primary fields in two-dimensional conformal field theory are the direct analogues of the primary fields in the D>2 dimensional case.

== Superconformal field theory ==
In $D\le 6$ dimensions, conformal algebra allows graded extensions containing fermionic generators. Quantum field theories invariant with respect to such extended algebras are called superconformal. In superconformal field theories, one considers superconformal primary operators.

In $D>2$ dimensions, superconformal primaries are annihilated by $K_\mu$ and by the fermionic generators $S$ (one for each supersymmetry generator). Generally, each superconformal primary representations will include several primaries of the conformal algebra, which arise by acting with the supercharges $Q$ on the superconformal primary. There exist also special chiral superconformal primary operators, which are primary operators annihilated by some combination of the supercharges.

In $D=2$ dimensions, superconformal field theories are invariant under super Virasoro algebras, which include infinitely many fermionic operators. Superconformal primaries are annihilated by all lowering operators, bosonic and fermionic.

== Unitarity bounds ==
In unitary (super)conformal field theories, dimensions of primary operators satisfy lower bounds called the unitarity bounds. Roughly, these bounds say that the dimension of an operator must be not smaller than the dimension of a similar operator in free field theory. In four-dimensional conformal field theory, the unitarity bounds were first derived by Ferrara, Gatto and Grillo and by Mack.
