= Conformal dimension =

In mathematics, the conformal dimension of a metric space X is the infimum of the Hausdorff dimension over the conformal gauge of X, that is, the class of all metric spaces quasisymmetric to X.

== Formal definition ==
Let X be a metric space and $\mathcal{G}$ be the collection of all metric spaces that are quasisymmetric to X. The conformal dimension of X is defined as such

$$\mathrm{Cdim} X = \inf_{Y \in \mathcal{G}} \dim_H Y$$

== Properties ==
We have the following inequalities, for a metric space X:

$$\dim_T X \leq \mathrm{Cdim} X \leq \dim_H X$$

The second inequality is true by definition. The first one is deduced from the fact that the topological dimension is invariant by homeomorphism and it is always smaller than or equal to the Hausdorff dimension.

== Examples ==
- The conformal dimension of $\mathbf{R}^N$ is N, since the topological and Hausdorff dimensions of Euclidean spaces agree.
- The Cantor set K is of null conformal dimension. However, there is no metric space quasisymmetric to K with a 0 Hausdorff dimension.

== See also ==
- Anomalous scaling dimension
