= Dym (disambiguation) =

DYM, or Dymeclin, is a protein that in humans is encoded by the DYM gene.

Dym or DYM may also refer to:

- Downshire Young Men, football club in Northern Ireland
- Dunmurry Young Men, football club in Northern Ireland
- Dym equation, the third-order partial differential equation in the theory of solitons
- ISO 639:dym or Yanda Dogon, a language spoken in Mali
- Dini Ya Msambwa, an African traditional religion and political movement who stood against colonialism.

== People with the surname ==
- Anna Dym, better known as Broadway Rose, an American panhandler who gained notoriety in the 1940s
- Clive Dym (1942–2016), American professor emeritus of Engineering Design
- Harry Dym (1938–2024), Israeli mathematics professor

== See also ==
- Dim (disambiguation)
