= Topological recursion =

In mathematics, topological recursion is a recursive definition of invariants of spectral curves. It has applications in enumerative geometry, random matrix theory, mathematical physics, string theory, knot theory.

== Introduction ==
The topological recursion is a construction in algebraic geometry. It takes as initial data a spectral curve: the data of $\left(\Sigma,\Sigma_0,x,\omega_{0,1},\omega_{0,2}\right)$, where: $x:\Sigma\to\Sigma_0$ is a covering of Riemann surfaces with ramification points; $\omega_{0,1}$ is a meromorphic differential 1-form on $\Sigma$, regular at the ramification points; $\omega_{0,2}$ is a symmetric meromorphic bilinear differential form on $\Sigma^2$ having a double pole on the diagonal and no residue.

The topological recursion is then a recursive definition of infinite sequences of symmetric meromorphic n-forms $\omega_{g,n}$ on $\Sigma^n$, with poles at ramification points only, for integers g≥0 such that 2g-2+n>0. The definition is a recursion on the integer 2g-2+n.

In many applications, the n-form $\omega_{g,n}$ is interpreted as a generating function that measures a set of surfaces of genus g and with n boundaries. The recursion is on 2g-2+n the Euler characteristics, whence the name "topological recursion".

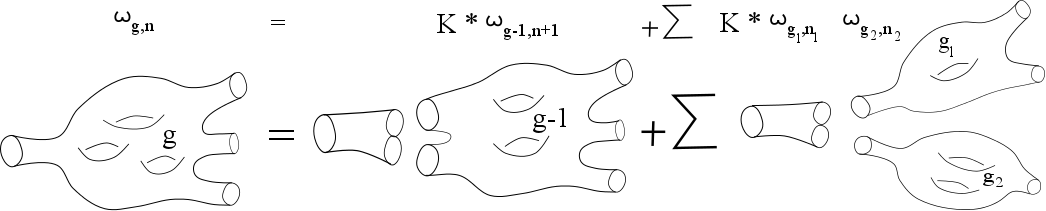
Schematic illustration of the topological recursion: recursively adding pairs of pants to build a surface of genus g with n boundaries

== Origin ==
The topological recursion was first discovered in random matrices. One main goal of random matrix theory, is to find the large size asymptotic expansion of n-point correlation functions, and in some suitable cases, the asymptotic expansion takes the form of a power series. The n-form $\omega_{g,n}$ is then the g^{th} coefficient in the asymptotic expansion of the n-point correlation function. It was found that the coefficients $\omega_{g,n}$ always obey the same recursion on 2g-2+n. The idea to consider this universal recursion relation beyond random matrix theory, and to promote it as a definition of algebraic curves invariants, occurred in Eynard-Orantin 2007 who studied the main properties of those invariants.

An important application of topological recursion was to Gromov–Witten invariants. Marino and BKMP conjectured that Gromov–Witten invariants of a toric Calabi–Yau 3-fold $\mathfrak X$ are the TR invariants of a spectral curve that is the mirror of $\mathfrak X$.

Since then, topological recursion has generated a lot of activity in particular in enumerative geometry. The link to Givental formalism and Frobenius manifolds has been established.

== Definition ==
(Case of simple branch points. For higher order branchpoints, see the section Higher order ramifications below)

- For $n\geq 1$ and $2g-2+n>0$:

$$\begin{align}\omega_{g,n}(z_1,z_2,\dots,z_{n}) &=\sum_{a=\text{branchpoints}} \operatorname{Res}_{z\to a} K(z_1,z,\sigma_a(z)) \Big( \omega_{g-1,n+1}(z,\sigma_a(z),z_2,\dots,z_n) \\
&\qquad\qquad\qquad + \mathop{{\sum}'}_{\overset{g_1+g_2=g}{I_1\uplus I_2=\{z_2,\dots,z_n\} }} \omega_{g_1,1+\# I_1}(z,I_1)\omega_{g_2,1+\# I_2}(\sigma_a(z),I_2) \Big) \end{align}$$
where $K(z_1,z_2,z_3)$ is called the recursion kernel: $K(z_1,z_2,z_3) = \frac{\frac12 \int_{z'=z_3}^{z_2} \omega_{0,2}(z_1,z')}{\omega_{0,1}(z_2)-\omega_{0,1}(z_3)}$
and $\sigma_a$ is the local Galois involution near a branch point $a$, it is such that $x(\sigma_a(z))=x(z)$. The primed sum ${\sum}'$ means excluding the two terms $(g_1,I_1)=(0,\emptyset)$ and $(g_2,I_2)=(0,\emptyset)$.

- For $n=0$ and $2g-2>0$:

$F_g = \omega_{g,0} = \frac{1}{2-2g}\ \sum_{a=\text{branchpoints}} \operatorname{Res}_{z\to a} F_{0,1}(z) \omega_{g,1}(z)$
with $dF_{0,1}=\omega_{0,1}$ any antiderivative of $\omega_{0,1}$.

- The definition of $F_0=\omega_{0,0}$ and $F_1=\omega_{1,0}$ is more involved and can be found in the original article of Eynard-Orantin.

== Main properties ==
- Symmetry: each $\omega_{g,n}$ is a symmetric $n$-form on $\Sigma^n$.
- poles: each $\omega_{g,n}$ is meromorphic, it has poles only at branchpoints, with vanishing residues.
- Homogeneity: $\omega_{g,n}$ is homogeneous of degree $2-2g-n$. Under the change $\omega_{0,1}\to \lambda \omega_{0,1}$, we have $\omega_{g,n}\to \lambda^{2-2g-n}\omega_{g,n}$.
- Dilaton equation:

$\sum_{a=\text{branchpoints}} \operatorname{Res}_{z\to a} F_{0,1}(z)\ \omega_{g,n+1}(z_1,\dots,z_n,z) = (2g-2+n) \omega_{g,n}(z_1,\dots,z_n)$
where $dF_{0,1}=\omega_{0,1}$.

- Loop equations: The following forms have no poles at branchpoints

$\sum_{z\in x^{-1}(x)} \omega_{g,n+1}(z,z_1,\dots,z_n)$
$\sum_{\{z\neq z'\} \subset x^{-1}(x)} \Big(\omega_{g,n+1}(z,z',z_2,\dots,z_n) + \sum_{\overset{g_1+g_2=g}{I_1\uplus I_2=\{z_2,\dots,z_n\} }} \omega_{g_1,1+\# I_1}(z,I_1)\omega_{g_2,1+\# I_2}(z',I_2) \Big)$
where the sum has no prime, i.e. no term excluded.

- Deformations: The $\omega_{g,n}$ satisfy deformation equations
- Limits: given a family of spectral curves $\mathcal S_t$, whose limit as $t\to 0$ is a singular curve, resolved by rescaling by a power of $t^\mu$, then $\lim_{t\to 0} t^{(2-2g-n)\mu}\omega_{g,n}(\mathcal S_t) = \omega_{g,n}(\lim_{t\to 0} t^\mu \mathcal S_t)$.
- Symplectic invariance: In the case where $\Sigma$ is a compact algebraic curve with a marking of a symplectic basis of cycles, $x$ is meromorphic and $\omega_{0,1}=ydx$ is meromorphic and $\omega_{0,2}=B$ is the fundamental second kind differential normalized on the marking, then the spectral curve $\mathcal S=(\Sigma,\mathbb C,x,ydx,B)$ and $\tilde{\mathcal S}=(\Sigma,\mathbb C,y,-xdy,B)$, have the same $F_g$ shifted by some terms.
- Modular properties: In the case where $\Sigma$ is a compact algebraic curve with a marking of a symplectic basis of cycles, and $\omega_{0,2}=B$ is the fundamental second kind differential normalized on the marking, then the invariants $\omega_{g,n}$ are quasi-modular forms under the modular group of marking changes. The invariants $\omega_{g,n}$ satisfy BCOV equations.

== Generalizations ==
=== Higher order ramifications ===
In case the branchpoints are not simple, the definition is amended as follows (simple branchpoints correspond to k=2):

$$\begin{align}
\omega_{g,n}(z_1,z_2,\dots,z_{n}) =
&\sum_{a=\text{branchpoints}} \operatorname{Res}_{z\to a}
\sum_{k=2}^{{\rm order}_x(a)} \sum_{J \subset x^{-1}(x(z))\setminus\{z\},\,\# J=k-1}
K_k(z_1,z,J) \\
& \qquad \cdot\sum_{J_1,\dots , J_\ell \vdash J\cup\{z\}} \sum'_{\overset{g_1+\dots+g_\ell=g+\ell-k}{I_1\uplus \dots I_\ell=\{z_2,\dots,z_n\} }} \prod_{i=1}^l \omega_{g_i,\# J_i+\# I_i}(J_i,I_i)
\end{align}$$

The first sum is over partitions $J_1,\dots,J_\ell$ of $J\cup\{z\}$ with non empty parts $J_i\neq \emptyset$, and in the second sum, the prime means excluding all terms such that $(g_i,\# J_i+\# I_i)=(0,1)$.

$K_k$ is called the recursion kernel:
$K_k(z_0,z_1,\dots,z_k) = \frac{\int_{z'=*}^{z_1} \omega_{0,2}(z_0,z')}{\prod_{i=2}^k (\omega_{0,1}(z_1)-\omega_{0,1}(z_i))}$
The base point * of the integral in the numerator can be chosen arbitrarily in a vicinity of the branchpoint, the invariants $\omega_{g,n}$ will not depend on it.

== Topological recursion invariants and intersection numbers ==
The invariants $\omega_{g,n}$ can be written in terms of intersection numbers of tautological classes:
(*)
$$\begin{align}
\omega_{g,n}(z_1,\dots,z_n)
= 2^{3g-3+n} &\sum_{G=\text{Graphs}} \frac{1}{\#\text{Aut}(G)} \int_{\left(\prod_{v=\text{vertices}} {\overline{\mathcal M}}_{g_v,n_v} \right)}\,\, \prod_{v=\text{vertices}} e^{\sum_k \hat t_{\sigma(v),k} \kappa_k} \\ &\prod_{(p,p')=\text{nodal points}} \left(\sum_{d,d'} B_{\sigma(p),2d;\sigma(p'),2d'} \psi_p^d \psi_{p'}^{d'}\right) \prod_{p_i=\text{marked points}\, i=1,\dots,n} \left(\sum_{d_i} \psi_{p_i}^{d_i} d\xi_{\sigma(p_i),d_i}(z_i) \right)
\end{align}$$
where the sum is over dual graphs of stable nodal Riemann surfaces of total arithmetic genus $g$, and $n$ smooth labeled marked points $p_1,\dots,p_n$, and equipped with a map $\sigma:\{\text{vertices}\}\to \{\text{branchpoints}\}$. $\psi_p=c_1(\mathcal L_p)$ is the Chern class of the cotangent line bundle $\mathcal L_p$ whose fiber is the cotangent plane at $p$. $\kappa_k$ is the $k$^{th} Mumford's kappa class. The coefficients $\hat t_{a,k}$, $B_{a,k;a',k'}$, $d\xi_{a,k}(z)$, are the Taylor expansion coefficients of $\omega_{0,1}$ and $\omega_{0,2}$ in the vicinity of branchpoints as follows: in the vicinity of a branchpoint $a$ (assumed simple), a local coordinate is $\zeta_a(z)=\sqrt{x(z)-a}$. The Taylor expansion of $\omega_{0,2}(z,z')$ near branchpoints $z\to a$, $z'\to a'$ defines the coefficients $B_{a,d;a',d'}$
$\omega_{0,2}(z,z') \mathop{{\sim}}_{z\to a,\ z'\to a'} \left( \frac{\delta_{a,a'} }{(\zeta_a(z)-\zeta_{a'}(z'))^2}+ 2\pi \sum_{d,d'=0}^\infty \frac{B_{a,d;a',d'}}{\Gamma(\frac{d+1}{2})\Gamma(\frac{d'+1}{2})}\, \zeta_a(z)^d \zeta_{a'}(z')^{d'} \right) d\zeta_a(z)d\zeta_{a'}(z')$.
The Taylor expansion at $z'\to a$, defines the 1-forms coefficients $d\xi_{a,d}(z)$
$d\xi_{a,d}(z) = \frac{-\Gamma(d+\frac12)}{\Gamma(\frac12)} \operatorname{Res}_{z'\to a} (x(z')-a)^{-d-\frac12}\omega_{0,2}(z,z')$ whose Taylor expansion near a branchpoint $a'$ is
$d\xi_{a,d}(z) \mathop{{\sim}}_{z\to a'} \frac{-\delta_{a,a'} (2d+1)!! d\zeta_a(z)}{2^d \zeta_a(z)^{2d+2}}+ \sum_{k=0}^\infty \frac{B_{a,2d;a',2k} 2^{k+1}}{(2k-1)!!}\zeta_{a'}(z)^{2k} d\zeta_{a'}(z)$.
Write also the Taylor expansion of $\omega_{0,1}$
$\omega_{0,1}(z) \mathop{{\sim}}_{z\to a} \sum_{k=0}^\infty t_{a,k}\ \frac{\Gamma(\frac12)}{(k+1)\Gamma(\frac{k+1}{2})}\ \zeta_{a}(z)^{k} d\zeta_{a}(z)$.
Equivalently, the coefficients $t_{a,k}$ can be found from expansion coefficients of the Laplace transform, and the coefficients $\hat t_{a,k}$ are the expansion coefficients of the log of the Laplace transform
$\int_{x(z)-x(a)\in \mathbb R_+} \omega_{0,1}(z) e^{-u x(z)} = \frac{e^{-ux(a)}\sqrt\pi}{2 u^{3/2}} \sum_{k=0}^\infty t_{a,k} u^{-k} = \frac{e^{-ux(a)}\sqrt\pi}{2 u^{3/2}} e^{-\sum_{k=0}^\infty \hat t_{a,k} u^{-k}}$ .

For example, we have
$\omega_{0,3}(z_1,z_2,z_3) = \sum_a e^{\hat t_{a,0}} d\xi_{a,0}(z_1)d\xi_{a,0}(z_2)d\xi_{a,0}(z_3).$

$\omega_{1,1}(z) = 2 \sum_a e^{\hat t_{a,0}} \left( \frac{1}{24} d\xi_{a,1}(z) + \frac{\hat t_{a,1}}{24} d\xi_{a,0}(z) +\frac12 B_{a,0;a,0} d\xi_{a,0}(z)\right).$

The formula (*) generalizes ELSV formula as well as Mumford's formula and Mariño-Vafa formula.

== Some applications in enumerative geometry ==
=== Mirzakhani's recursion ===
M. Mirzakhani's recursion for hyperbolic volumes of moduli spaces is an instance of topological recursion. For the choice of spectral curve $\left(\mathbb C; \ \mathbb C;\ x: z\mapsto z^2 ;\ \omega_{0,1}(z)=\frac{4}{\pi} z \sin{(\pi z)} dz;\,\omega_{0,2}(z_1,z_2) = \frac{dz_1 dz_2}{(z_1-z_2)^2}\right)$
the n-form $\omega_{g,n} = d_1 \dots d_n F_{g,n}$ is the Laplace transform of the Weil-Petersson volume
$F_{g,n}(z_1,\dots,z_n) = \int_0^\infty e^{-z_1L_1} dL_1 \dots \int_0^\infty e^{-z_nL_n} dL_n \quad \int_{\mathcal M_{g,n}(L_1,\dots,L_n)} w$
where $\mathcal M_{g,n}(L_1,\dots,L_n)$ is the moduli space of hyperbolic surfaces of genus g with n geodesic boundaries of respective lengths $L_1,\dots,L_n$, and $w$ is the Weil-Petersson volume form.
The topological recursion for the n-forms $\omega_{g,n}(z_1,\dots,z_n)$, is then equivalent to Mirzakhani's recursion.

=== Witten–Kontsevich intersection numbers ===
For the choice of spectral curve $\left(\mathbb C; \ \mathbb C;\ x: z\mapsto z^2 ;\ \omega_{0,1}(z)=2z^2 dz;\,\omega_{0,2}(z_1,z_2) = \frac{dz_1 dz_2}{(z_1-z_2)^2}\right)$
the n-form $\omega_{g,n}= d_1 \dots d_n F_{g,n}$ is
$F_{g,n}(z_1,\dots,z_n) = 2^{2-2g-n}\sum_{d_1+\dots+d_n=3g-3+n} \prod_{i=1}^n \frac{(2d_i-1)!! }{z_i^{2d_i+1}} \quad \left\langle\tau_{d_1}\dots\tau_{d_n}\right\rangle_g$
where $\left\langle\tau_{d_1}\dots\tau_{d_n}\right\rangle_g$ is the Witten-Kontsevich intersection number of Chern classes of cotangent line bundles in the compactified moduli space of Riemann surfaces of genus g with n smooth marked points.

=== Hurwitz numbers ===
For the choice of spectral curve $\left(\mathbb C; \ \mathbb C;\ x:z \mapsto -z+\ln{z} ;\ \omega_{0,1}(z)=(1-z) dz;\,\omega_{0,2}(z_1,z_2) = \frac{dz_1 dz_2}{(z_1-z_2)^2}\right)$
the n-form $\omega_{g,n}= d_1 \dots d_n F_{g,n}$ is
$F_{g,n}(z_1,\dots,z_n) = \sum_{\ell(\mu)\leq n} m_\mu(e^{x(z_1)},\dots,e^{x(z_n)}) \quad h_{g,\mu_1,\dots,\mu_n}$
where $h_{g,\mu}$ is the connected simple Hurwitz number of genus g with ramification $\mu=(\mu_1,\dots,\mu_n)$: the number of branch covers of the Riemann sphere by a genus g connected surface, with 2g-2+n simple ramification points, and one point with ramification profile given by the partition $\mu$.

=== Gromov–Witten numbers and the BKMP conjecture ===
Let $\mathfrak X$ a toric Calabi–Yau 3-fold, with Kähler moduli $t_1,\dots,t_{b_2(\mathfrak X)}$. Its mirror manifold is singular over a complex plane curve $\Sigma$ given by a polynomial equation $P(e^x,e^y)=0$, whose coefficients are functions of the Kähler moduli. For the choice of spectral curve $\left(\Sigma; \ \mathbb C^*;\ x ;\ \omega_{0,1}=y dx;\,\omega_{0,2} \right)$ with $\omega_{0,2}$ the fundamental second kind differential on $\Sigma$,
According to the BKMP conjecture, the n-form $\omega_{g,n}= d_1 \dots d_n F_{g,n}$ is
$F_{g,n}(z_1,\dots,z_n) = \sum_{\mathbf d\in H_2(\mathfrak X,\mathbb Z)} \sum_{\mu_1,\dots,\mu_n\in H_1(\mathcal L,\mathbb Z)} t^d \prod_{i=1}^n e^{x(z_i)} \mathcal N_{g}(\mathfrak X,\mathcal L;\mathbf d,\mu_1,\dots,\mu_n)$
where $\mathcal N_{g}(\mathfrak X,\mathcal L;\mathbf d,\mu_1,\dots,\mu_n) = \int_{[{\overline{\mathcal M}}_{g,n}(\mathfrak X,\mathcal L, \mathbf d,\mu_1,\dots,\mu_n)]^{\rm vir}} 1$
is the genus g Gromov–Witten number, representing the number of holomorphic maps of a surface of genus g into $\mathfrak X$, with n boundaries mapped to a special Lagrangian submanifold $\mathcal L$. $\mathbf d=(d_1,\dots,d_{b_2(\mathfrak X)})$ is the 2nd relative homology class of the surface's image, and $\mu_i\in H_1(\mathcal L,\mathbb Z)$ are homology classes (winding number) of the boundary images.
The BKMP conjecture has since then been proven.
