= Korteweg–De Vries hierarchy =

Infinite sequence of differential equations

In mathematics, the Korteweg–De Vries (KdV) hierarchy is an infinite sequence of mutually compatible nonlinear evolution equations containing the Korteweg–de Vries equation as its first nontrivial member. It is one of the central examples in the theory of integrable systems and soliton equations, because it combines several characteristic features of integrability: a Lax formulation, infinitely many commuting flows and conserved quantities, Hamiltonian and bi-Hamiltonian structures, and exact solution methods such as the inverse scattering transform and finite-gap integration.

It is most commonly formulated as a family of Lax equations for the one-dimensional Schrödinger operator
$$L=\partial_x^2+u(x),$$
or, equivalently up to sign conventions, $L=-\partial_x^2+u(x)$. The hierarchy consists of commuting flows in auxiliary variables $t_0,t_1,t_2,\dots$, each of which preserves the spectral data of $L$. In periodic and quasiperiodic settings, this spectral interpretation leads to the theory of finite-gap and algebro-geometric solutions, while more broadly the hierarchy serves as a prototype for many later integrable hierarchies and reductions such as the modified KdV and KP hierarchies.

== Definition ==
Let
$$L=\partial_x^2+u(x,t_0,t_1,t_2,\dots).$$
The KdV hierarchy may be defined by requiring that $L$ evolve according to the family of Lax equations
$$\frac{\partial L}{\partial t_n}=[P_{2n+1},L], \qquad n=0,1,2,\dots,$$
where each $P_{2n+1}$ is an odd-order differential operator determined by $L$. A compact way to construct these operators uses formal pseudodifferential operators:
$$\frac{\partial L}{\partial t_n}=\big[(L^{(2n+1)/2})_+,L\big],$$
where $(\cdot)_+$ denotes the differential part of a formal pseudodifferential operator. This formulation implies that the flows commute:
$$\frac{\partial}{\partial t_m}\frac{\partial L}{\partial t_n}=\frac{\partial}{\partial t_n}\frac{\partial L}{\partial t_m},$$
so one may regard the hierarchy as a compatible overdetermined system for $u$ depending on infinitely many times.

Equivalent descriptions can be given in terms of commuting Hamiltonian vector fields or the Lenard–Magri recursion scheme. In all of these formulations, the distinguishing feature of the hierarchy is that it produces infinitely many compatible flows, all associated with the same Schrödinger operator.

== First flows ==
Although the Lax operator is written here as $L=\partial_x^2+u$, it is customary to display the nonlinear equations in an equivalent convention obtained by replacing $u$ by $-u$ and rescaling the time variables. In that convention, the first few equations of the hierarchy are
$$\begin{aligned}
u_{t_0} &= u_x,\\
u_{t_1} &= 6uu_x-u_{xxx},\\
u_{t_2} &= u_{xxxxx}-10u u_{xxx}-20u_xu_{xx}+30u^2u_x.
\end{aligned}$$
The $t_0$-flow is the translation flow. The $t_1$-flow is the Korteweg–de Vries equation itself, up to the conventional replacement $t_1=t$. Higher members are called the higher KdV equations. Different sign conventions for $L$ and different normalizations of the times produce equivalent formulas with altered coefficients or signs.

=== Computing the first flows ===
The first few equations of the hierarchy can be derived explicitly from the pseudodifferential definition. Let
$$L=\partial^2+u,\qquad \partial=\partial_x,$$
and define
$$B_{2n+1}=\left(L^{(2n+1)/2}\right)_+,$$
where $(\cdot)_+$ denotes the differential part of a formal pseudodifferential operator. The KdV hierarchy is then
$$\frac{\partial L}{\partial t_n}=[B_{2n+1},L],\qquad n=0,1,2,\dots.$$

To compute the first flows one begins with the formal square root
$$L^{1/2}=\partial+a_1\partial^{-1}+a_2\partial^{-2}+a_3\partial^{-3}+a_4\partial^{-4}+\cdots,$$
whose coefficients are determined by the requirement
$$\left(L^{1/2}\right)^2=L.$$

The basic multiplication rule is
$$\partial^m f=\sum_{k\ge 0}\binom{m}{k}f^{(k)}\partial^{\,m-k},$$
valid for all integers $m$, where the generalized binomial coefficients are used for negative $m$. In particular,
$$\partial f=f\partial+f_x,\qquad
\partial^{-1}f=f\partial^{-1}-f_x\partial^{-2}+f_{xx}\partial^{-3}-\cdots.$$

Substituting the series for $L^{1/2}$ into $(L^{1/2})^2=L$ and comparing coefficients of powers of $\partial$ gives the coefficients recursively. The coefficient of $\partial^0$ is
$$2a_1=u,$$
so
$$a_1=\frac12u.$$
The coefficient of $\partial^{-1}$ is
$$2a_2+a_{1,x}=0,$$
so
$$a_2=-\frac14u_x.$$
The coefficient of $\partial^{-2}$ is
$$2a_3+a_{2,x}+a_1^2=0,$$
so
$$a_3=\frac18(u_{xx}-u^2).$$
The coefficient of $\partial^{-3}$ is
$$2a_4+a_{3,x}+2a_1a_2-a_1a_{1,x}=0,$$
so
$$a_4=\frac1{16}(6uu_x-u_{xxx}).$$

Thus
$$L^{1/2}
=
\partial
+\frac12u\,\partial^{-1}
-\frac14u_x\,\partial^{-2}
+\frac18(u_{xx}-u^2)\,\partial^{-3}
+\frac1{16}(6uu_x-u_{xxx})\,\partial^{-4}
+\cdots.$$

=== The t_{0}-flow ===
Since
$$B_1=(L^{1/2})_+=\partial,$$
the first Lax equation is
$$\frac{\partial L}{\partial t_0}=[\partial,L].$$
Now
$$[\partial,\partial^2+u]=u_x,$$
so comparing the zeroth-order terms gives
$$u_{t_0}=u_x.$$
This is the translation flow.

=== The t_{1}-flow ===
Next,
$$B_3=(L^{3/2})_+=(L\cdot L^{1/2})_+.$$
Using the expansion above and keeping only nonnegative powers of $\partial$ gives
$$B_3=\partial^3+\frac32u\,\partial+\frac34u_x.$$

To compute the corresponding evolution equation, expand the commutator:
$$[B_3,L]
=
\left[\partial^3+\frac32u\,\partial+\frac34u_x,\partial^2+u\right].$$
Using
$$[\partial^3,u]=u_{xxx}+3u_{xx}\partial+3u_x\partial^2,$$
$$[u\partial,\partial^2]=-2u_x\partial^2-u_{xx}\partial,$$
$$[u\partial,u]=uu_x,$$
and
$$[u_x,\partial^2]=-2u_{xx}\partial-u_{xxx},$$
one finds that the $\partial^2$ and $\partial$ terms cancel and
$$[B_3,L]=\frac14u_{xxx}+\frac32uu_x.$$
Since $\partial L/\partial t_1$ has zeroth-order part $u_{t_1}$, this yields
$$u_{t_1}=\frac14(u_{xxx}+6uu_x).$$

Writing $v=-u$ and $s_1=-t_1/4$, and then renaming $(v,s_1)$ as $(u,t_1)$, gives the more familiar form
$$u_{t_1}=6uu_x-u_{xxx}.$$

=== The t_{2}-flow ===
Similarly,
$$B_5=(L^{5/2})_+=(L^2\cdot L^{1/2})_+.$$
A straightforward calculation gives
$$B_5=
\partial^5
+\frac52u\,\partial^3
+\frac{15}{4}u_x\,\partial^2
+\left(\frac{15}{8}u^2+\frac{25}{8}u_{xx}\right)\partial
+\frac{15}{16}(2uu_x+u_{xxx}).$$

Substituting this into
$$\frac{\partial L}{\partial t_2}=[B_5,L]$$
and again comparing zeroth-order terms gives
$$u_{t_2}
=
\frac1{16}\left(
u_{xxxxx}
+10u\,u_{xxx}
+20u_xu_{xx}
+30u^2u_x
\right).$$

Writing $v=-u$ and $s_2=t_2/16$, and then renaming $(v,s_2)$ as $(u,t_2)$, gives $u_{t_2}=u_{xxxxx}-10u\,u_{xxx}-20u_xu_{xx}+30u^2u_x.$

=== Remarks on conventions ===
The coefficients above depend on the sign convention for the Schrödinger operator and on the normalization of the time variables. Many references use $L=-\partial^2+u$ instead of $L=\partial^2+u$, or rescale the variables $t_n$. These changes alter some signs and numerical factors but not the underlying hierarchy.

This computation shows explicitly how the first members of the hierarchy arise from the formal half-powers of $L$: one expands $L^{1/2}$, extracts the differential parts of the odd powers, and then reads off the induced evolution equation for $u$ from the commutator $[B_{2n+1},L]$.

== Hamiltonian structure ==
The KdV hierarchy is also a Hamiltonian hierarchy. The KdV equation admits infinitely many conserved functionals, and choosing these successively as Hamiltonians produces the higher flows. In the standard Poisson formulation, the hierarchy can be written schematically as
$$u_{t_n}=\partial_x \frac{\delta I_n}{\delta u},$$
where $I_n[u]$ are conserved quantities in involution. This Hamiltonian point of view is closely related to the Gelfand–Dikii formalism and to the bi-Hamiltonian structure of KdV.

=== Hamiltonians and Lenard–Magri recursion ===
In the sign and time normalization of the displayed equation $u_{t_1}=6uu_x-u_{xxx}$, one introduces two compatible Poisson operators
$$P_0=\partial_x,\qquad
P_1=-\partial_x^3+2u\,\partial_x+2\partial_xu.$$
If $H_n[u]$ are Hamiltonians whose variational derivatives satisfy the Lenard–Magri recursion
$$P_1\frac{\delta H_n}{\delta u}=P_0\frac{\delta H_{n+1}}{\delta u},$$
then the KdV flows are
$$u_{t_n}=P_0\frac{\delta H_{n+1}}{\delta u}=P_1\frac{\delta H_n}{\delta u}.$$
This is the bi-Hamiltonian formulation of the hierarchy.

The Hamiltonians may also be constructed directly from the Lax operator. In the formal pseudodifferential approach, one first considers the odd half-powers of
$$L=\partial_x^2+u$$
and takes their residues, that is, the coefficients of $\partial_x^{-1}$. Up to conventional numerical factors and the addition of total derivatives, the functionals
$$\int \operatorname{res} L^{(2n+1)/2}\,dx,\qquad n=0,1,2,\dots,$$
are conserved quantities of the hierarchy. Applying the potential sign change and time rescalings described above gives Hamiltonians for the displayed convention. The corresponding residue densities are the Gelfand–Dikii polynomials associated with $L$.

With this normalization one may take, for example,
$$H_0=\frac12\int u\,dx,\qquad
H_1=\frac12\int u^2\,dx,\qquad
H_2=\int\left(u^3+\frac12u_x^2\right)\,dx.$$
Then
$$u_{t_0}=P_0\frac{\delta H_1}{\delta u}=u_x,$$
the translation flow, while
$$u_{t_1}=P_0\frac{\delta H_2}{\delta u}
=\partial_x(3u^2-u_{xx})
=6uu_x-u_{xxx},$$
which is the Korteweg–de Vries equation itself. Higher Hamiltonians generate the higher KdV equations in the same way.

In this formulation the conserved quantities are in involution with respect to both Poisson brackets, and the compatibility of $P_0$ and $P_1$ implies that the Hamiltonian vector fields commute. Thus the Hamiltonian, recursion, and Lax formulations are equivalent descriptions of the same hierarchy.

== Spectral interpretation ==
A Lax equation implies that the operator $L$ evolves isospectrally. Thus the spectral data of the auxiliary Schrödinger problem are preserved along each KdV flow. In the case of periodic potentials, this may be expressed in terms of Floquet or Bloch spectral data. Let $T$ be the translation operator $T\psi(x)=\psi(x+1)$. For a 1-periodic potential $u$, one studies pairs $(\lambda,\alpha)$ for which there exists a nonzero solution of
$$(\partial_x^2+u)\psi=\lambda\psi,\qquad T\psi=\alpha\psi.$$
The resulting Bloch–Floquet spectrum is invariant under the KdV flows. This periodic spectral problem is one of the main starting points for finite-gap integration.

== Tau-function ==
For many purposes, a solution of the KdV hierarchy is encoded by a tau-function $\tau(t_0,t_1,t_2,\dots)$, defined up to multiplication by the exponential of an arbitrary linear function of the times. In the normalization $L=\partial_x^2+2u$ used in the matrix-resolvent construction below,
$$u=\partial_x^2\log\tau,\qquad x=t_0.$$
More generally, higher logarithmic derivatives of $\tau$ give the correlation functions or $n$-point functions of the hierarchy. This provides a compact way to organize the commuting KdV flows and their bilinear identities, and it is a standard language for exact solutions of integrable hierarchies.

Recent work of Dubrovin, Yang, and Zagier expresses the generating series of the logarithmic derivatives of the tau-function in terms of the basic matrix resolvent of the Schrödinger operator, and equivalently in terms of an associated wave function and dual wave function.

A distinguished example is the Witten–Kontsevich tau-function, whose logarithm is the generating function for intersection numbers of $\psi$-classes on the Deligne–Mumford moduli spaces $\overline{\mathcal M}_{g,n}$. Edward Witten conjectured that this generating function is a tau-function of the KdV hierarchy satisfying the string equation, and Maxim Kontsevich proved the conjecture using the matrix Airy function. This result established a major connection between the KdV hierarchy, two-dimensional gravity, and intersection theory on moduli spaces of curves.

== Matrix resolvent and wave-function approach ==
Another formulation of the KdV hierarchy uses a matrix resolvent associated with the Schrödinger operator. In a common normalization one writes the scalar Lax operator as $L=\partial_x^2+2u$ and introduces the corresponding first-order $2\times 2$ matrix operator
$$\mathcal{L}=\partial_x+\Lambda(\lambda)+q,\qquad
\Lambda(\lambda)=\begin{pmatrix}0&1\\ \lambda&0\end{pmatrix},\qquad
q=\begin{pmatrix}0&0\\ -2u&0\end{pmatrix}.$$
The basic matrix resolvent is the unique formal $\mathfrak{sl}_2$-valued Laurent series $R(\lambda)$ satisfying
$$[\mathcal{L},R(\lambda)]=0,\qquad
R(\lambda)=\Lambda(\lambda)+\text{lower-order terms},\qquad
\operatorname{tr}R(\lambda)^2=2\lambda.$$
Here lower order refers to the standard principal grading, in which $\deg\lambda=2$ and the upper- and lower-triangular generators of $\mathfrak{sl}_2$ have degrees $1$ and $-1$, respectively. The upper-right entry $b(\lambda)$ has a recursive expansion whose coefficients determine the commuting KdV derivations.

In this approach the tau-function is encoded by generating series built from $R(\lambda)$. Dubrovin, Yang, and Zagier showed that for any solution of the hierarchy the logarithmic derivatives of the tau-function can be written in terms of the basic matrix resolvent, and then gave equivalent formulas in terms of a wave function $\psi(z,t)$ and its dual $\psi^*(z,t)$. These satisfy the auxiliary linear problems for the hierarchy, and their product recovers the resolvent entry:
$$\psi(z,t)\psi^*(z,t)=b(z^2,t).$$
From them one forms the kernel
$$D(z,w,t)=\frac{\psi(z,t)\,\partial_x\psi^*(w,t)-\psi^*(w,t)\,\partial_x\psi(z,t)}{w^2-z^2},$$
and the generating series of the $n$-point correlation functions of $\log\tau$ is obtained as a cyclic sum of products of these kernels. An equivalent formula uses a gauge-invariant kernel built only from $b(z^2,t)$.

This does not replace the usual Lax or pseudodifferential definitions of the hierarchy, but it gives another effective way to compute its tau-function data. In particular, after specializing to $t_1=t_2=\cdots=0$, a pair of wave functions determined by the initial data yields all logarithmic derivatives of $\tau$ of order at least two, and hence determines $\tau$ up to its exponential-linear ambiguity. This makes the method useful for explicit solutions such as the Witten–Kontsevich, generalized Brézin–Gross–Witten, and Lamé-type solutions discussed by Dubrovin, Yang, and Zagier.

Writing the basic matrix resolvent as
$$R(\lambda)=\begin{pmatrix}a(\lambda)&b(\lambda)\\ c(\lambda)&-a(\lambda)\end{pmatrix},$$
the equation $[\partial_x+\Lambda(\lambda)+q,R(\lambda)]=0$ gives
$$a=\frac12 b_x,\qquad c=(\lambda-2u)b-\frac12 b_{xx},$$
and hence the scalar third-order equation
$$b_{xxx}-4(\lambda-2u)b_x+4u_x\,b=0.$$
The normalization $\operatorname{tr}R(\lambda)^2=2\lambda$ is equivalent to
$$b\,b_{xx}-\frac12 b_x^2-2(\lambda-2u)b^2=-2\lambda.$$
Expanding
$$b(\lambda)=\sum_{k\ge -1} b_k\,\lambda^{-k-1},\qquad b_{-1}=1,$$
one obtains the recursive differential relation
$$\partial_x b_k
=
2u\,\partial_x b_{k-1}
+u_x\,b_{k-1}
+\frac14\,\partial_x^3 b_{k-1},
\qquad k\ge 0,$$
together with an algebraic recursion that determines each $b_k$ uniquely from the previous coefficients. The first terms are
$$b_0=u,\qquad
b_1=\frac32u^2+\frac14u_{xx}.$$
These coefficients generate the hierarchy recursively: after the same choice of time normalizations used elsewhere in this article, they reproduce the translation flow, the KdV equation, and the higher KdV equations. In this form, the differential recursion is the Lenard–Magri recursion written in matrix-resolvent language.

== Soliton solutions ==
Among the best-known exact solutions of the KdV hierarchy are its soliton solutions. In a common normalization they are written in terms of a tau-function by
$$u=-2\,\partial_x^2\log \tau.$$
For the Korteweg–de Vries equation itself,
$$u_{t_1}=6uu_x-u_{xxx},$$
the one-soliton solution is
$$u(x,t_1)=-2\kappa^2\operatorname{sech}^2\!\big(\kappa(x-4\kappa^2 t_1-x_0)\big),$$
where $\kappa>0$ and $x_0$ are constants. It is a localized travelling wave of permanent shape, and its speed is proportional to its amplitude.

More generally, the $N$-soliton solutions may be written as
$$\tau=\sum_{\mu_i\in\{0,1\}}
\exp\!\left(
\sum_{i=1}^N \mu_i\eta_i+\sum_{1\le i<j\le N}\mu_i\mu_jA_{ij}
\right),$$
where
$$e^{A_{ij}}=\left(\frac{\kappa_i-\kappa_j}{\kappa_i+\kappa_j}\right)^2.$$
For the KdV equation, one may take
$$\eta_i=2\kappa_i x-8\kappa_i^3 t_1+\delta_i,$$
with constants $\delta_i$. The resulting solutions describe nonlinear superpositions of solitary waves. After interaction, the solitons re-emerge with the same amplitudes and speeds, differing only by phase shifts; this elastic scattering behavior is one of the characteristic features of integrable systems.

The same tau-function form extends to the full KdV hierarchy. One lets each phase $\eta_i$ depend linearly on all hierarchy times
$$t_0=x,\;t_1,\;t_2,\dots,$$
with coefficients proportional to odd powers of $\kappa_i$. Thus a single choice of soliton parameters determines a compatible solution of all commuting KdV flows. In this sense, the hierarchy soliton solutions are the simultaneous soliton solutions of the entire family of equations, not just of the first KdV flow.

From the spectral point of view, soliton solutions correspond to reflectionless Schrödinger operators. The discrete eigenvalues of the associated one-dimensional Schrödinger problem determine the soliton parameters $\kappa_i$, while the absence of reflection is responsible for their exact transmission and elastic scattering properties.

== Inverse scattering transform ==
For rapidly decaying initial data on the real line, the KdV equation can be solved by the inverse scattering transform. One studies the associated one-dimensional Schrödinger operator
$$L=-\partial_x^2+u(x,t),$$
or, after multiplying the spectral equation by $-1$, the equivalent convention $\widetilde L=\partial_x^2+\widetilde u$ with $\widetilde u=-u$ and the spectral parameter reversed in sign. One then computes the scattering data: the reflection coefficient, the discrete eigenvalues, and the corresponding norming constants. The nonlinear evolution of $u$ is converted into a linear evolution of this scattering data.

In Lax-pair language, the operator $L$ evolves isospectrally, so its eigenvalues are independent of time. For the KdV flow, the time dependence of the remaining scattering data is elementary: the reflection coefficient acquires a simple exponential phase factor, while the discrete eigenvalues remain fixed and the norming constants evolve exponentially. The potential $u(x,t)$ is then recovered from the scattering data by solving the Gelfand–Levitan–Marchenko integral equation.

This method explains the special role of soliton solutions. Reflectionless scattering data produce exact multi-soliton solutions, while more general decaying data produce dispersive solutions together with any soliton component determined by the discrete spectrum. In this way, the inverse scattering transform plays for KdV a role analogous to that of the Fourier transform for linear dispersive equations.

The same scattering problem underlies the full KdV hierarchy. The higher flows preserve the spectrum of the same Schrödinger operator, and they act by different linear phase evolutions on the same scattering data. Thus the inverse scattering transform provides a common solution method for all flows of the hierarchy, not only for the first KdV equation.

== Finite-gap solutions ==
One may consider the hierarchy as an overdetermined system for
$$u=u(x=t_0,t_1,t_2,\dots).$$
A finite-gap potential is characterized by the existence of a nonzero odd-order differential operator commuting with $L$. Equivalently, it satisfies a stationary equation for a suitable linear combination of KdV flows. The remaining hierarchy flows restrict to commuting translations on the corresponding finite-dimensional isospectral manifold. In the periodic case finite-gap potentials are described by hyperelliptic spectral curves, and the corresponding solutions may be written in terms of Riemann theta functions. For smooth periodic finite-gap potentials, genus $0$ gives constant solutions, while genus $1$ gives the cnoidal wave solutions of KdV.

Finite-gap solutions form an important and explicitly describable class of periodic and quasiperiodic solutions, but they do not exhaust the definition of the hierarchy itself. In particular, they should be regarded as special solutions singled out by additional spectral or stationarity conditions, rather than as the general form of a periodic KdV solution.

== Miura transformation and modified KdV hierarchy ==
A closely related integrable hierarchy is the modified KdV hierarchy (mKdV hierarchy) for a function $v=v(x,t_0,t_1,t_2,\dots)$. With the normalization used in this article, its first nontrivial flow is
$$v_{t_1}=6v^2v_x-v_{xxx},$$
together with higher compatible flows in the variables $t_2,t_3,\dots$. Whereas the KdV hierarchy is commonly written in terms of the second-order Schrödinger operator, the modified hierarchy is naturally formulated by a first-order $2\times 2$ Lax operator, and may also be viewed as the $\mathfrak{sl}_2$ Drinfeld–Sokolov hierarchy.

The relation between the two hierarchies is given by the Miura transformation
$$u=v_x+v^2.$$
If $v$ satisfies the modified KdV equation, then $u$ satisfies the KdV equation
$$u_{t_1}=6uu_x-u_{xxx}.$$
More generally, the Miura transformation sends each flow of the mKdV hierarchy to the corresponding flow of the KdV hierarchy. Since the modified KdV equation is invariant under $v\mapsto -v$, one also obtains the companion transformation
$$u=-v_x+v^2.$$
These two maps are often taken together as the Miura map.

In the alternative sign convention $L=-\partial_x^2+u$, the Miura transformation is reflected in the factorization
$$-\partial_x^2+u=(\partial_x+v)(-\partial_x+v)$$
or
$$-\partial_x^2+u=(-\partial_x+v)(\partial_x+v),$$
which yields $u=v_x+v^2$ and $u=-v_x+v^2$, respectively. This factorization helps explain why many constructions for the KdV hierarchy have parallel versions for mKdV, and why the two hierarchies are often discussed together.

Geometric reformulations interpret the Miura transformation as the passage from first-order connection data to the associated projective connection; in the $\mathfrak{sl}_2$ case, this is reflected in the factorization of the Schrödinger operator into first-order factors.

== Matrix KdV hierarchy ==
A noncommutative or matrix KdV hierarchy is obtained by allowing the dependent variable to take values in an associative algebra, in particular in the algebra of $N\times N$ matrices. In one standard convention, its first nontrivial member is the matrix KdV equation
$$U_t=U_{xxx}+3(UU_x+U_xU),$$
where the nonlinear term is symmetrized because matrix multiplication is not commutative. After changing the signs of the dependent variable and time, the convention used for the displayed scalar equation gives
$$U_{t_1}=3(UU_x+U_xU)-U_{xxx}.$$
When $U$ commutes with $U_x$, in particular in the scalar case, this reduces to the scalar KdV equation.

Carillo and Schiebold developed operator-valued KdV and modified KdV hierarchies by recursion methods, with the matrix case appearing as the finite-dimensional specialization of the same noncommutative framework. Their work gives explicit recursion operators and solution formulas for the KdV, potential KdV, and modified KdV hierarchies in both the scalar and matrix settings.

More broadly, matrix $r$-KdV hierarchies arise in the theory of matrix Gelfand–Dikii hierarchies and generalized Drinfeld–Sokolov reductions. In this setting one works with matrix pseudodifferential Lax operators, and the scalar KdV hierarchy is recovered as the case $p=1$.

== Relation to other hierarchies ==
The KdV hierarchy is a reduction of the KP hierarchy. It also appears in the theory of commuting ordinary differential operators, in the inverse scattering transform, and in algebro-geometric approaches to integrable systems.

Twistor-theoretic approaches interpret the KdV hierarchy as a symmetry reduction of anti-self-dual Yang–Mills theory; in work of Mason and Sparling, the KdV and nonlinear Schrödinger hierarchies arise from a Bogomolny hierarchy after the imposition of an additional symmetry, and the inverse scattering transform is interpreted as a coordinate realization of the twistor correspondence.

== History ==
The modern theory begins with the discovery that the KdV equation admits a Lax representation, which explains the existence of infinitely many conserved quantities and its spectral invariants. The periodic spectral theory and finite-gap construction were developed in work of Lax, Novikov, Dubrovin, Matveev, and Krichever in the 1970s.

== See also ==
- Lax pair
- Gelfand–Dikii hierarchy
- KP hierarchy
- Finite-gap integration
- Inverse scattering transform
