= Lambda g conjecture =

In algebraic geometry, the $\lambda_g$-conjecture gives a particularly simple formula for certain integrals on the Deligne–Mumford compactification $\overline{\mathcal M}_{g, n}$ of the moduli space of curves with marked points. It was first found as a consequence of the Virasoro conjecture by E. Getzler and R. Pandharipande (1998). Later, it was proven by C. Faber and R. Pandharipande (2003) using virtual localization in Gromov–Witten theory. It is named after the factor of $\lambda_g$, the gth Chern class of the Hodge bundle, appearing in its integrand. The other factor is a monomial in the $\psi_i$, the first Chern classes of the n cotangent line bundles, as in Witten's conjecture.

Let $a_1, \ldots, a_n$ be positive integers such that:

$$a_1 + \cdots + a_n = 2g-3+n.$$

Then the $\lambda_g$-formula can be stated as follows:

$$\int_{\overline{\mathcal M}_{g, n}} \psi_1^{a_1} \cdots \psi_n^{a_n}\lambda_g = \binom{2g + n - 3}{a_1, \ldots, a_n} \int_{\overline{\mathcal M}_{g, 1}} \psi_1^{2g - 2}\lambda_g.$$

The $\lambda_g$-formula in combination with

$$\int_{\overline{\mathcal M}_{g, 1}} \psi_1^{2g - 2}\lambda_g = \frac{2^{2g-1} - 1}{2^{2g - 1}} \frac{|B_{2g}|}{(2g)!},$$

where the B_{2g} are Bernoulli numbers, gives a way to calculate all integrals on $\overline{\mathcal M}_{g, n}$ involving products in $\psi$-classes and a factor of $\lambda_g$.
