= Virasoro =

Virasoro can refer to:

== People ==
- Miguel Ángel Virasoro (philosopher) (1900–1966)
- Miguel Ángel Virasoro (physicist) (1940–2021)

== Places ==
- Gobernador Virasoro, a city in Argentina

== Science and mathematics ==
- Virasoro algebra in mathematics and physics
- Virasoro conjecture in mathematics
- Virasoro element of a vertex operator algebra
- Virasoro minimal model in physics
