= ELSV formula =

Mathematical formula in algebraic geometry

In mathematics, the ELSV formula, named after its four authors Torsten Ekedahl, Sergei Lando, Michael Shapiro, Alek Vainshtein, is an equality between a Hurwitz number (counting ramified coverings of the sphere) and an integral over the moduli space of stable curves.

Several fundamental results in the intersection theory of moduli spaces of curves can be deduced from the ELSV formula, including the Witten conjecture, the Virasoro constraints, and the $\lambda_g$-conjecture.

It is generalized by the Gopakumar–Mariño–Vafa formula.

== The formula ==
Define the Hurwitz number

$$h_{g; k_1, \dots, k_n}$$

as the number of ramified coverings of the complex projective line (Riemann sphere, $\mathbb{P}^1(\C))$ that are connected curves of genus g, with n numbered preimages of the point at infinity having multiplicities $k_1, \dots, k_n$ and m more simple branch points. Here if a covering has a nontrivial automorphism group G it should be counted with weight $1/|G|$.

The ELSV formula then reads

$$h_{g;k_1, \dots, k_n} = \dfrac{m!}{\#\text{Aut}(k_1 , \ldots , k_n)} \prod_{i=1}^n \frac{k_i^{k_i}}{k_i!} \int_{\overline{\mathcal{M}}_{g,n}} \frac{c(E^*)}{(1-k_1\psi_1) \cdots (1-k_n \psi_n)}.$$

Here the notation is as follows:

- $g\ge 0$ is a nonnegative integer;
- $n\ge 1$ is a positive integer;
- $k_1, \dots, k_n$ are positive integers;
- $\#\operatorname{Aut}(k_1 , \ldots , k_n)$ is the number of automorphisms of the n-tuple $(k_1 , \ldots , k_n);$
- $m = \sum k_i + n + 2g-2;$
- $\overline{\mathcal{M}}_{g,n}$ is the moduli space of stable curves of genus g with n marked points;
- E is the Hodge vector bundle and c(E*) the total Chern class of its dual vector bundle;
- ψ_{i} is the first Chern class of the cotangent line bundle to the i-th marked point.

The numbers

$$h_{g;k_1, \dots, k_n}$$

in the left-hand side have a combinatorial definition and satisfy properties that can be proved combinatorially. Each of these properties translates into a statement on the integrals on the right-hand side of the ELSV formula (Kazarian 2009).

== The Hurwitz numbers ==
The Hurwitz numbers

$$h_{g;k_1, \dots, k_n}$$

also have a definition in purely algebraic terms. With K = k_{1} + ... + k_{n} and m = K + n + 2g − 2, let τ_{1}, ..., τ_{m} be transpositions in the symmetric group S_{K} and σ a permutation with n numbered cycles of lengths k_{1}, ..., k_{n}. Then

$$( \tau_1 , \dots, \tau_m, \sigma)$$

is a transitive factorization of identity of type (k_{1}, ..., k_{n}) if the product

$$\tau_1 \cdots \tau_m \sigma$$

equals the identity permutation and the group generated by

$$\tau_1, \dots, \tau_m$$

is transitive.

Definition. $h_{g;k_1, \dots, k_n}$ is the number of transitive factorizations of identity of type (k_{1}, ..., k_{n}) divided by K!.

Example A. The number $h_{g;k}$ is 1/k! times the number of lists of transpositions $(\tau_1, \dots, \tau_{k+2g-1})$ whose product is a k-cycle. In other words, $h_{g;k}$ is 1/k times the number of factorizations of a given k-cycle into a product of k + 2g − 1 transpositions.

The equivalence between the two definitions of Hurwitz numbers (counting ramified coverings of the sphere, or counting transitive factorizations) is established by describing a ramified covering by its monodromy. More precisely: choose a base point on the sphere, number its preimages from 1 to K (this introduces a factor of K!, which explains the division by it), and consider the monodromies of the covering about the branch point. This leads to a transitive factorization.

== The integral over the moduli space ==
The moduli space ${\overline {\mathcal{M}}}_{g,n}$ is a smooth Deligne–Mumford stack of (complex) dimension 3g − 3 + n. (Heuristically this behaves much like complex manifold, except that integrals of characteristic classes that are integers for manifolds are rational numbers for Deligne–Mumford stacks.)

The Hodge bundle E is the rank g vector bundle over the moduli space ${\overline {\mathcal{M}}}_{g,n}$ whose fiber over a curve (C, x_{1}, ..., x_{n}) with n marked points is the space of abelian differentials on C. Its Chern classes are denoted by

$$\lambda_j = c_j(E) \in H^{2j}({\overline {\mathcal{M}}}_{g,n},\mathbf{Q}).$$

We have

$$c(E^*) = 1 - \lambda_1 + \lambda_2 - \cdots+ (-1)^g \lambda_g.$$

The ψ-classes. Introduce line bundles $\mathcal{L}_1, \ldots, \mathcal{L}_n$ over ${\overline {\mathcal{M}}}_{g,n}$. The fiber of $\mathcal{L}_i$ over a curve (C, x_{1}, ..., x_{n}) is the cotangent line to C at x_{i}. The first Chern class of $\mathcal{L}_i$ is denoted by

$$\psi_i = c_1(\mathcal{L}_i) \in H^2({\overline {\mathcal{M}}}_{g,n},\mathbf{Q}).$$

The integrand. The fraction $1/(1-k_i \psi_i)$ is interpreted as $1 + k_i \psi_i + k_i^2 \psi_i^2 + \cdots$, where the sum can be cut at degree 3g − 3 + n (the dimension of the moduli space). Thus the integrand is a product of n + 1 factors. We expand this product, extract from it the part of degree 3g − 3 + n and integrate it over the moduli space.

The integral as a polynomial. It follows that the integral

$$\int_{\overline{\mathcal{M}}_{g,n}} \frac{c(E^*)}{(1-k_1\psi_1) \cdots (1-k_n \psi_n)}$$

is a symmetric polynomial in variables k_{1}, ..., k_{n}, whose monomials have degrees between 3g − 3 + n and 2g − 3 + n. The coefficient of the monomial $k_1^{d_1} \cdots k_n^{d_n}$ equals

$$\int_{\overline{\mathcal{M}}_{g,n}} (-1)^j \lambda_j \psi_1^{d_1} \cdots \psi_n^{d_n},$$

where

$$j = 3g-3+n - \sum d_i.$$

Remark. The polynomiality of the numbers

$$\frac{h_{g;k_1, \dots, k_n}}{m!} \prod_{i=1}^n \frac{k_i!}{k_i^{k_i}}$$

was first conjectured by I. P. Goulden and D. M. Jackson. No proof independent from the ELSV formula is known.

Example B. Let g = n = 1. Then

$$\int_{\overline{\mathcal{M}}_{g,n}} \frac{c(E^*)}{(1-k_1\psi_1) \cdots (1-k_n \psi_n)} = \int_{\overline{\mathcal{M}}_{1,1}} \frac{1-\lambda_1}{1-k_1\psi_1} = \left[\int_{\overline{\mathcal{M}}_{1,1}} \psi_1 \right] k_1 - \left[ \int_{\overline{\mathcal{M}}_{1,1}} \lambda_1\right].$$

== Example ==
Let n = g = 1. To simplify the notation, denote k_{1} by k. We have m = K + n + 2g − 2 = k + 1.

According to Example B, the ELSV formula in this case reads

$$h_{1;k} = (k+1)!\frac{k^k}{k!} \int_{\overline{\mathcal{M}}_{1,1}} \frac{1-\lambda_1}{1-k\psi_1} = (k+1) k^k \left\{ \left[ \int_{\overline{\mathcal{M}}_{1,1}} \psi_1\right] k - \left[ \int_{\overline{\mathcal{M}}_{1,1}} \lambda_1 \right]\right\}.$$

On the other hand, according to Example A, the Hurwitz number h_{1, k} equals 1/k times the number of ways to decompose a k-cycle in the symmetric group S_{k} into a product of k + 1 transpositions. In particular, h_{1, 1} = 0 (since there are no transpositions in S_{1}), while h_{1, 2} = 1/2 (since there is a unique factorization of the transposition (1 2) in S_{2} into a product of three transpositions).

Plugging these two values into the ELSV formula we find

$$\int_{\overline{\mathcal{M}}_{1,1}} \psi_1 = \int_{\overline{\mathcal{M}}_{1,1}} \lambda_1= \frac1{24}.$$

From which we deduce

$$h_{1;k} = \frac{(k^2-1) k^k}{24}.$$

== History ==
The ELSV formula was announced by Ekedahl et al. (1999), but with an erroneous sign. Fantechi & Pandharipande (2002) proved it for k_{1} = ... = k_{n} = 1 (with the corrected sign). Graber & Vakil (2003) proved the formula in full generality using the localization techniques. The proof announced by the four initial authors followed (Ekedahl et al. 2001). Now that the space of stable maps to the projective line relative to a point has been constructed by Li (2001), a proof can be obtained immediately by applying the virtual localization to this space.

Kazarian (2009), building on preceding work of several people, gave a unified way to deduce most known results in the intersection theory of ${\overline{\mathcal{M}}}_{g,n}$ from the ELSV formula.

== Idea of proof ==
Let $\mathcal{M}_{g;k_1, \dots, k_n}$ be the space of stable maps f from a genus g curve to P^{1}(C) such that f has exactly n poles of orders $k_1, \dots, k_n$.

The branching morphism br or the Lyashko–Looijenga map assigns to $f \in \mathcal{M}_{g;k_1, \dots, k_n}$ the unordered set of its m branch points in C with multiplicities taken into account. Actually, this definition only works if f is a smooth map. But it has a natural extension to the space of stable maps. For instance, the value of f on a node is considered a double branch point, as can be seen by looking at the family of curves C_{t} given by the equation xy = t and the family of maps f_{t}(x, y) = x + y. As t → 0, two branch points of f_{t} tend towards the value of f_{0} at the node of C_{0}.

The branching morphism is of finite degree, but has infinite fibers. Our aim is now to compute its degree in two different ways.

The first way is to count the preimages of a generic point in the image. In other words, we count the ramified coverings of P^{1}(C) with a branch point of type (k_{1}, ..., k_{n}) at ∞ and m more fixed simple branch points. This is precisely the Hurwitz number $h_{g;k_1, \dots, k_n}$.

The second way to find the degree of br is to look at the preimage of the most degenerate point, namely, to put all m branch points together at 0 in C.

The preimage of this point in $\mathcal{M}_{g;k_1, \dots, k_n}$ is an infinite fiber of br isomorphic to the moduli space $\overline{\mathcal{M}}_{g,n}$. Indeed, given a stable curve with n marked points we send this curve to 0 in P^{1}(C) and attach to its marked points n rational components on which the stable map has the form $z \mapsto z^{k_1}, \dots, z \mapsto z^{k_n}$. Thus we obtain all stable maps in $\mathcal{M}_{g;k_1, \dots, k_n}$ unramified outside 0 and ∞. Standard methods of algebraic geometry allow one to find the degree of a map by looking at an infinite fiber and its normal bundle. The result is expressed as an integral of certain characteristic classes over the infinite fiber. In our case this integral happens to be equal to the right-hand side of the ELSV formula.

Thus the ELSV formula expresses the equality between two ways to compute the degree of the branching morphism.
