= Miguel Ángel Virasoro =

Miguel Ángel Virasoro may refer to:

- Miguel Ángel Virasoro (philosopher) (1900–1966), Argentinian philosopher
- Miguel Ángel Virasoro (physicist) (1940–2021), Argentine physicist
