= Eleny Ionel =

Romanian American mathematician

Eleny-Nicoleta Ionel (born April 1969) is a Romanian mathematician whose research concerns symplectic geometry, including the study of the Gromov–Witten invariants and Gopakumar–Vafa invariants. Among her most significant results are the proofs of Gopakumar-Vafa conjectures (joint with Thomas H. Parker et al.), and the proof of Getzler's conjecture, asserting vanishing in codimension at least g of the tautological ring of the moduli space of genus-g curves.

She is a professor of mathematics at Stanford University, where she was chair of the mathematics department from 2016 to 2019.

== Education and career ==
Ionel is from Iași. She is the daughter of Adrian Ionel, a professor at the Ion Ionescu de la Brad University of Agricultural Sciences and Veterinary Medicine of Iași. She attended the prestigious Costache Negruzzi National College, graduating in 1987. She earned a bachelor's degree from Alexandru Ioan Cuza University in 1991, and completed her Ph.D. in 1996 from Michigan State University. Her dissertation, Genus One Enumerative Invariants in $\mathbf{P}^n$, was supervised by Thomas H. Parker.

After postdoctoral research at the Mathematical Sciences Research Institute in Berkeley, California and a position as C. L. E. Moore instructor at the Massachusetts Institute of Technology, she joined the University of Wisconsin–Madison faculty in 1998, and moved to Stanford in 2004.

== Recognition ==
Ionel is a Sloan Research Fellow and a Simons Fellow. She was an invited speaker at the International Congress of Mathematicians in 2002. She was selected as a Fellow of the American Mathematical Society in the 2020 Class, for "contributions to symplectic geometry and the geometric analysis approach to Gromov–Witten Theory".

== Selected publications ==
- Ionel, Eleny-Nicoleta (2002), "Topological recursive relations in $H^{2g}(\mathcal{M}_{g,n})$", Inventiones Mathematicae, 148 (3): 627–658, doi:10.1007/s002220100205, MR 1908062, S2CID 125964304
- Ionel, Eleny-Nicoleta; Parker, Thomas H. (2003), "Relative Gromov-Witten invariants", Annals of Mathematics, Second Series, 157 (1): 45–96, arXiv:math/9907155, doi:10.4007/annals.2003.157.45, MR 1954264, S2CID 13395029
- Ionel, Eleny-Nicoleta; Parker, Thomas H. (2018), "The Gopakumar–Vafa formula for symplectic manifolds", Annals of Mathematics, Second Series, 187 (1): 1–64, arXiv:1306.1516, doi:10.4007/annals.2018.187.1.1, MR 3739228, S2CID 7070264
