= Dim sum (disambiguation) =

Dim sum is a type of cuisine, a range of small dishes in small pieces served typically for breakfast, brunch, lunch, in Cantonese cuisine.

Dim Sum or dimsum or variation, may also refer to:

- Yum cha (a.k.a. go dim sum), the Cantonese practise of going out for dim sum
- Dim sum brunch, the Cantonese restaurant practise of serving dim sum cuisine "at dim sum"
- Dim Sum Building, Singapore; a university building shaped like dim sum bamboo steamer baskets
- Dim sum bond, a financial instrument, a bond denominated in renminbi (RMB, CNY, ¥; 元;) Chinese yuan, issued outside of the People's Republic of China
- Dimsum Entertainment, a television station in Malaysia; see List of television stations in Malaysia
- Dimsum Magazine, a Chinese and English language LGBT magazine; see List of LGBT periodicals
- Dim Sum: A Little Bit of Heart, a 1985 U.S. comedy film

== See also ==
- Project DMSSM ("Designed, Modernized and Streamlined Supply Chain and Manufacturing", pronounced as "dimsum") of the Chinese restaurant chain in the Philippines, Chowking
- Category:Dim sum
- Dim (disambiguation)
- Sum (disambiguation)
