= Tautological ring =

Mathematical Concept

In algebraic geometry, the tautological ring is the subring of the Chow ring of the moduli space of curves generated by tautological classes. These are classes obtained from 1 by pushforward along various morphisms described below. The tautological cohomology ring is the image of the tautological ring under the cycle map (from the Chow ring to the cohomology ring).

== Definition ==
Let $\overline{\mathcal{M}}_{g,n}$ be the moduli stack of stable marked curves $(C;x_1,\ldots,x_n)$, such that

- C is a complex curve of arithmetic genus g whose only singularities are nodes,
- the n points x_{1}, ..., x_{n} are distinct smooth points of C,
- the marked curve is stable, namely its automorphism group (leaving marked points invariant) is finite.

The last condition requires $2g-2+n>0$ in other words (g,n) is not among (0,0), (0,1), (0,2), (1,0). The stack $\overline{\mathcal{M}}_{g,n}$ then has dimension $3g-3+n$. Besides permutations of the marked points, the following morphisms between these moduli stacks play an important role in defining tautological classes:

- Forgetful maps $\overline{\mathcal{M}}_{g,n} \to \overline{\mathcal{M}}_{g,n-1}$ which act by removing a given point x_{k} from the set of marked points, then restabilizing the marked curved if it is not stable anymore.
- Gluing maps $\overline{\mathcal{M}}_{g,n+1}\times\overline{\mathcal{M}}_{g',n'+1} \to \overline{\mathcal{M}}_{g+g',n+n'}$ that identify the k-th marked point of a curve to the l-th marked point of the other. Another set of gluing maps is $\overline{\mathcal{M}}_{g,n+2} \to \overline{\mathcal{M}}_{g+1,n}$ that identify the k-th and l-th marked points, thus increasing the genus by creating a closed loop.

The tautological rings $R^\bullet(\overline{\mathcal{M}}_{g,n})$ are simultaneously defined as the smallest subrings of the Chow rings closed under pushforward by forgetful and gluing maps.

The tautological cohomology ring $RH^\bullet(\overline{\mathcal{M}}_{g,n})$ is the image of $R^\bullet (\overline{\mathcal{M}}_{g,n})$ under the cycle map. As of 2016, it is not known whether the tautological and tautological cohomology rings are isomorphic.

== Generating set ==
For $1\leq k\leq n$ we define the class $\psi_k\in R^\bullet(\overline{\mathcal{M}}_{g,n})$ as follows. Let $\delta_k$ be the pushforward of 1 along the gluing map $\overline{\mathcal{M}}_{g,n}\times\overline{\mathcal{M}}_{0,3}\to\overline{\mathcal{M}}_{g,n+1}$ which identifies the marked point x_{k} of the first curve to one of the three marked points y_{i} on the sphere (the latter choice is unimportant thanks to automorphisms). For definiteness order the resulting points as x_{1}, ..., x_{k−1}, y_{1}, y_{2}, x_{k+1}, ..., x_{n}. Then $\psi_k$ is defined as the pushforward of $-\delta_k^2$ along the forgetful map that forgets the point y_{2}. This class coincides with the first Chern class of a certain line bundle.

For $i\geq 1$ we also define $\kappa_i\in R^\bullet(\overline{\mathcal{M}}_{g,n})$ be the pushforward of $(\psi_k)^{i+1}$ along the forgetful map $\overline{\mathcal{M}}_{g,n+1}\to\overline{\mathcal{M}}_{g,n}$ that forgets the k-th point. This is independent of k (simply permute points).

Theorem. $R^\bullet(\overline{\mathcal{M}}_{g,n})$ is additively generated by pushforwards along (any number of) gluing maps of monomials in $\psi$ and $\kappa$ classes.

These pushforwards of monomials (hereafter called basic classes) do not form a basis. The set of relations is not fully known.

Theorem. The tautological rings are invariant under pullback along gluing and forgetful maps. There exist universal combinatorial formulae expressing pushforwards, pullbacks, and products of basic classes as linear combinations of basic classes.

== Faber conjectures ==
The tautological ring $R^\bullet(\mathcal{M}_{g,n})$ on the moduli space of smooth n-pointed genus g curves simply consists of restrictions of classes in $R^\bullet(\overline{\mathcal{M}}_{g,n})$. We omit n when it is zero (when there is no marked point).

In the case $n=0$ of curves with no marked point, Mumford conjectured, and Madsen and Weiss proved, that for any $d>0$ the map $\Q[\kappa_1, \kappa_2, \ldots]\to H^\bullet(\mathcal{M}_g)$ is an isomorphism in degree d for large enough g. In this case all classes are tautological.

Conjecture (Faber). (1) Large-degree tautological rings vanish: $R^d(\mathcal{M}_g)=0$ for $d>g-2.$ (2) $R^{g-2}(\mathcal{M}_g)\cong\Q$ and there is an explicit combinatorial formula for this isomorphism. (3) The product (coming from the Chow ring) of classes defines a perfect pairing $R^{d}(\mathcal{M}_g) \times R^{g-d-2}(\mathcal{M}_g) \to R^{g-2}(\mathcal{M}_g) \cong \Q.$

Although $R^d(\mathcal{M}_g)$ trivially vanishes for $d>3g-3$ because of the dimension of $\mathcal{M}_g$, the conjectured bound is much lower. The conjecture would completely determine the structure of the ring: a polynomial in the $\kappa_j$ of cohomological degree d vanishes if and only if its pairing with all polynomials of cohomological degree $g-d-2$ vanishes.

Parts (1) and (2) of the conjecture were proven. Part (3), also called the Gorenstein conjecture, was only checked for $g<24$. For $g=24$ and higher genus, several methods of constructing relations between $\kappa$ classes find the same set of relations which suggest that the dimensions of $R^d(\mathcal{M}_g)$ and $R^{g-d-2}(\mathcal{M}_g)$ are different. If the set of relations found by these methods is complete then the Gorenstein conjecture is wrong. Besides Faber's original non-systematic computer search based on classical maps between vector bundles over $\mathcal{C}_g^d$, the d-th fiber power of the universal curve $\mathcal{C}_g = \mathcal{M}_{g,1} \twoheadrightarrow \mathcal{M}_g$, the following methods have been used to find relations:

- Virtual classes of the moduli space of stable quotients (over $\mathbb{P}^1$) by Pandharipande and Pixton.
- Witten's r-spin class and Givental-Telemann's classification of cohomological field theories, used by Pandharipande, Pixton, Zvonkine.
- Geometry of the universal Jacobian over $\mathcal{M}_{g,1}$, by Yin.
- Powers of theta-divisor on the universal abelian variety, by Grushevsky and Zakharov.

These four methods are proven to give the same set of relations.

Similar conjectures were formulated for moduli spaces $\overline{\mathcal{M}}_{g,n}$ of stable curves and $\mathcal{M}^{\text{c.t.}}_{g,n}$ of compact-type stable curves. However, Petersen-Tommasi proved that $R^\bullet(\overline{\mathcal{M}}_{2,20})$ and $R^\bullet(\mathcal{M}^{\text{c.t.}}_{2,8})$ fail to obey the (analogous) Gorenstein conjecture. On the other hand, Tavakol proved that for genus 2 the moduli space of rational-tails stable curves $\mathcal{M}^{\text{r.t.}}_{2,n}$ obeys the Gorenstein condition for every n.

== See also ==
- ELSV formula
- Hodge bundle
- Witten's conjecture
