= BCOV =

BCOV may refer to:

- Betacoronavirus (β-CoV), a virus
- Bovine coronavirus (BCoV), a virus
- Brightcove, an American company, stock ticker: BCOV
- BCOV equations in topological recursion
