= Inverse scattering transform =

Method for solving certain nonlinear partial differential equations

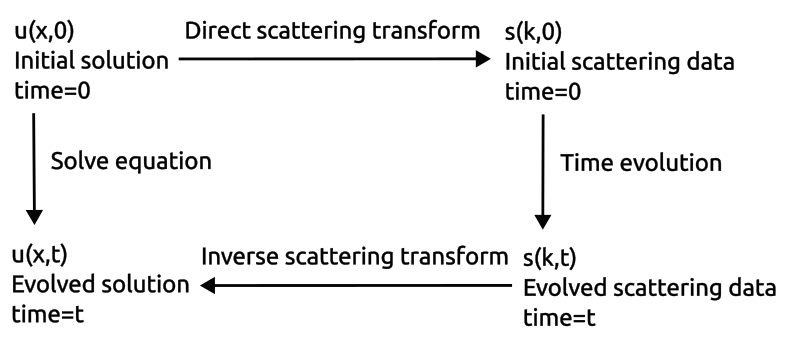
The 3-step algorithm: transform the initial solution to initial scattering data, evolve initial scattering data, transform evolved scattering data to evolved solution

In mathematics, the inverse scattering transform (or nonlinear Fourier transform) is a method that solves the initial value problem for a nonlinear partial differential equation using mathematical methods related to wave scattering. The direct scattering transform describes how a function scatters waves or generates bound-states. The inverse scattering transform uses wave scattering data to construct the function responsible for wave scattering. The direct and inverse scattering transforms are analogous to the direct and inverse Fourier transforms which are used to solve linear partial differential equations.

Using a pair of differential operators, a 3-step algorithm may solve nonlinear differential equations; the initial solution is transformed to scattering data (direct scattering transform), the scattering data evolves forward in time (time evolution), and the scattering data reconstructs the solution forward in time (inverse scattering transform).

This algorithm simplifies solving a nonlinear partial differential equation to solving 2 linear ordinary differential equations and an ordinary integral equation, a method ultimately leading to analytic solutions for many otherwise difficult to solve nonlinear partial differential equations.

The inverse scattering problem is equivalent to a Riemann–Hilbert factorization problem, at least in the case of equations of one space dimension. This formulation can be generalized to differential operators of order greater than two and also to periodic problems. In higher space dimensions one has instead a "nonlocal" Riemann–Hilbert factorization problem (with convolution instead of multiplication) or a d-bar problem.

== History ==
The inverse scattering transform arose from studying solitary waves. J.S. Russell described a "wave of translation" or "solitary wave" occurring in shallow water. First J.V. Boussinesq and later D. Korteweg and G. deVries discovered the Korteweg-deVries (KdV) equation, a nonlinear partial differential equation describing these waves. Later, N. Zabusky and M. Kruskal, using numerical methods for investigating the Fermi–Pasta–Ulam–Tsingou problem, found that solitary waves had the elastic properties of colliding particles; the waves' initial and ultimate amplitudes and velocities remained unchanged after wave collisions. These particle-like waves are called solitons and arise in nonlinear equations because of a weak balance between dispersive and nonlinear effects.

Gardner, Greene, Kruskal and Miura introduced the inverse scattering transform for solving the Korteweg–de Vries equation. Lax, Ablowitz, Kaup, Newell, and Segur generalized this approach which led to solving other nonlinear equations including the nonlinear Schrödinger equation, sine-Gordon equation, modified Korteweg–De Vries equation, Kadomtsev–Petviashvili equation, the Ishimori equation, Toda lattice equation, and the Dym equation. This approach has also been applied to different types of nonlinear equations including differential-difference, partial difference, multidimensional equations and fractional integrable nonlinear systems.

== Description ==
=== Nonlinear partial differential equation ===
The independent variables are a spatial variable $x$ and a time variable $t$. Subscripts or differential operators ($\partial_{x}, \partial_{t}$) indicate differentiation. The function $u(x,t)$ is a solution of a nonlinear partial differential equation, $u_{t}+N(u)=0$, with initial condition (value) $u(x,0)$.

=== Requirements ===
The differential equation's solution meets the integrability and Fadeev conditions:

Integrability condition:$\int^{\infty}_{-\infty} \ |u(x)| \ dx \ < \infty$
Fadeev condition: $\int^{\infty}_{-\infty} \ (1+|x|)|u(x)| \ dx \ < \infty$

=== Differential operator pair ===
The Lax differential operators, $L$ and $M$, are linear ordinary differential operators with coefficients that may contain the function $u(x,t)$ or its derivatives. The self-adjoint operator $L$ has a time derivative $L_{t}$ and generates a eigenvalue (spectral) equation with eigenfunctions $\psi$ and time-constant eigenvalues (spectral parameters) $\lambda$.

$L(\psi)=\lambda \psi , \$ and $\ L_{t}(\psi) \overset{def}{=}(L(\psi))_{t}-L(\psi_{t})$

The operator $M$ describes how the eigenfunctions evolve over time, and generates a new eigenfunction $\widetilde{\psi}$ of operator $L$ from eigenfunction $\psi$ of $L$.

$$\widetilde{\psi}=\psi_{t}-M(\psi) \$$

The Lax operators combine to form a multiplicative operator, not a differential operator, of the eigenfunctions $\psi$.

$$(L_{t}+LM-ML)\psi=0$$

The Lax operators are chosen to make the multiplicative operator equal to the nonlinear differential equation.

$$L_{t}+LM-ML=u_{t}+N(u)=0$$

The AKNS differential operators, developed by Ablowitz, Kaup, Newell, and Segur, are an alternative to the Lax differential operators and achieve a similar result.

=== Direct scattering transform ===
The direct scattering transform generates initial scattering data; this may include the reflection coefficients, transmission coefficient, eigenvalue data, and normalization constants of the eigenfunction solutions for this differential equation.

$$L(\psi)=\lambda \psi$$

=== Scattering data time evolution ===
The equations describing how scattering data evolves over time occur as solutions to a 1st order linear ordinary differential equation with respect to time. Using varying approaches, this first order linear differential equation may arise from the linear differential operators (Lax pair, AKNS pair), a combination of the linear differential operators and the nonlinear differential equation, or through additional substitution, integration or differentiation operations. Spatially asymptotic equations ($x \to \pm \infty$) simplify solving these differential equations.

=== Inverse scattering transform ===
The Marchenko equation combines the scattering data into a linear Fredholm integral equation. The solution to this integral equation leads to the solution, u(x,t), of the nonlinear differential equation.

== Example: Korteweg–De Vries equation ==
The nonlinear differential Korteweg–De Vries equation is

$$u_{t}-6uu_{x}+u_{xxx}=0$$

=== Lax operators ===
The Lax operators are:

$L= -\partial^{2}_{x}+u(x,t) \$ and $\ M= -4\partial^{3}_{x}+6u\partial_{x}+3u_{x}$

The multiplicative operator is:

$$L_{t}+LM-ML=u_{t}-6uu_{x}+u_{xxx}=0$$

=== Direct scattering transform ===
The solutions to this differential equation

$$L(\psi)=-\psi_{xx}+u(x,0)\psi= \lambda \psi$$

may include scattering solutions with a continuous range of eigenvalues (continuous spectrum) and bound-state solutions with discrete eigenvalues (discrete spectrum). The scattering data includes transmission coefficients $T(k,0)$, left reflection coefficient $R_{L}(k,0)$, right reflection coefficient $R_{R}(k,0)$, discrete eigenvalues $-\kappa^{2}_{1}, \ldots,-\kappa^{2}_{N}$, and left and right bound-state normalization (norming) constants.

$$c(0)_{Lj}=\left( \int^{\infty}_{-\infty} \ \psi^{2}_{L}(ik_{j},x,0) \ dx   \right)^{-1/2} \ j=1, \dots, N$$
$$c(0)_{Rj}=\left( \int^{\infty}_{-\infty} \ \psi^{2}_{R}(ik_{j},x,0) \ dx   \right)^{-1/2}  \ j=1, \dots, N$$

=== Scattering data time evolution ===
The spatially asymptotic left $\psi_{L}(k,x,t)$ and right $\psi_{R}(k,x,t)$ Jost functions simplify this step.

$$\begin{align}
\psi_{L}(x,k,t)&=e^{ikx}+o(1), \ x \to +\infty \\
\psi_{L}(x,k,t)&=\frac{e^{ikx}}{T(k,t)}+\frac{R_{L}(k,t)e^{-ikx}}{T(k,t)}+o(1), \ x \to - \infty \\
\psi_{R}(x,k,t)&=\frac{e^{-ikx}}{T(k,t)}+\frac{R_{R}(k,t)e^{ikx}}{T(k,t)}+o(1), \ x \to +\infty \\
\psi_{R}(x,k,t)&=e^{-ikx}+o(1), \ x \to -\infty \\
\end{align}$$

The dependency constants $\gamma_{j}(t)$ relate the right and left Jost functions and right and left normalization constants.

$$\gamma_{j}(t)=\frac{\psi_{L}(x,i\kappa_{j},t)}{\psi_{R}(x,i\kappa_{j},t)}=(-1)^{N-j} \frac{c_{Rj}(t)}{c_{Lj}(t)}$$

The Lax $M$ differential operator generates an eigenfunction which can be expressed as a time-dependent linear combination of other eigenfunctions.

$$\partial_{t}\psi_{L}(k,x,t)-M\psi_{L}(x,k,t)=
a_{L}(k,t)\psi_{L}(x,k,t)+b_{L}(k,t)\psi_{R}(x,k,t)$$
$$\partial_{t}\psi_{R}(k,x,t)-M\psi_{R}(x,k,t)=
a_{R}(k,t)\psi_{L}(x,k,t)+b_{R}(k,t)\psi_{R}(x,k,t)$$

The solutions to these differential equations, determined using scattering and bound-state spatially asymptotic Jost functions, indicate a time-constant transmission coefficient $T(k,t)$, but time-dependent reflection coefficients and normalization coefficients.

$$\begin{align}
R_{L}(k,t)&=R_{L}(k,0)e^{-i8k^{3}t} \\
R_{R}(k,t)&=R_{R}(k,0)e^{+i8k^{3}t} \\
c_{Lj}(t)&=c_{Lj}(0)e^{+4\kappa^{3}_{j}t}, \ j=1, \ldots, N \\
c_{Rj}(t)&=c_{Rj}(0)e^{-4\kappa^{3}_{j}t}, \ j=1, \ldots, N \end{align}$$

=== Inverse scattering transform ===
The Marchenko kernel is $F(x,t)$.

$$F(x,t)\overset{def}{=}\frac{1}{2 \pi} \int^{\infty}_{-\infty}
R_{R}(k,t)
e^{ikx} \ dk + \sum^{N}_{j=1} c(t)^{2}_{Lj}e^{-\kappa_{j}x}$$

The Marchenko integral equation is a linear integral equation solved for $K(x,y,t)$.

$$K(x,z,t)+F(x+z,t)+ \int^{\infty}_{x} K(x,y,t)F(y+z,t) \ dy=0$$

The solution to the Marchenko equation, $K(x,y,t)$, generates the solution $u(x,t)$ to the nonlinear partial differential equation.

$$u(x,t)= -2 \frac{\partial K(x,y,t)}{\partial x}$$

== Examples of integrable equations ==
- Korteweg–De Vries equation
- Nonlinear Schrödinger equation
- Camassa–Holm equation
- Sine-Gordon equation
- Toda lattice
- Ishimori equation
- Dym equation

== See also ==
- Quantum inverse scattering method
- Integrable system
