= Morikazu Toda =

Japanese physicist

- Born: 20 October 1917; Tokyo
- Died: 6 October 2010 (aged 92)
- Education: Tokyo University
- Known for: Toda lattice Toda oscillator
- Scientific career
- Fields: Physics

Morikazu Toda (戸田 盛和, Toda Morikazu; 20 October 1917 – 6 October 2010) was a Japanese physicist, best known for the discovery of the Toda lattice. His main interests were in statistical mechanics and condensed matter physics.

== Career ==
After graduating from the Department of Physics, Tokyo University he became associate professor first at Keijo University and then at the Tokyo University of Education (Kyoiku University). In 1952 he was promoted professor and held subsequent positions at Chiba University, Yokohama National University, and University of the Air. In addition, he had visiting positions at São Paulo University and Norwegian University of Science and Technology. He was a professor emeritus of the Tokyo University of Education.

In 1947 he received the Mainichi Shuppan-Bunka prize for his contributions to the theory of liquids and in 1981 the Fujihara Award for the discovery of the Toda lattice. He was a member of the Royal Norwegian Society of Sciences and Letters. He died of multiple organ failure on 6 October 2010.

== See also ==
- Toda field theory

== List of books available in English ==
- Selected Papers of Morikazu Toda (Series in Pure Mathematics). Edited by Miki Wadati (University of Tokyo). World Scientific 1993. ISBN 978-981-02-1469-2.doi:10.1142/2091
- Statistical Physics I: Equilibrium Statistical Mechanics (Springer Series in Solid-State Sciences) R. Kubo, N. Saito, and M. Toda. 2nd. Ed. 1992. ISBN 3-540-53662-0.
- Statistical Physics II: Nonequilibrium Statistical Mechanics (Springer Series in Solid-State Sciences) M. Toda, N. Saito, and R. Kubo. 2nd. Ed. 1991. ISBN 3-540-53833-X.
- Theory of Nonlinear Lattices (Springer Series in Solid-State Sciences). Springer 1989. ISBN 0-387-18327-2.doi:10.1007/978-3-642-83219-2
- Nonlinear Waves and Solitons. Mathematics and its Applications (Japanese Series). KTK Scientific Publishers 1989, Tokyo. ISBN 0-7923-0442-X
