= Dym equation =

In mathematics, and in particular in the theory of solitons, the Dym equation (HD) is the third-order partial differential equation

$$u_t = u^3u_{xxx}.\,$$

It is often written in the equivalent form for some function v of one space variable and time

$$v_t=(v^{-1/2})_{xxx}.\,$$

The Dym equation first appeared in Kruskal and is attributed to an unpublished paper by Harry Dym.

The Dym equation represents a system in which dispersion and nonlinearity are coupled together. HD is a completely integrable nonlinear evolution equation that may be solved by means of the inverse scattering transform. It obeys an infinite number of conservation laws; it does not possess the Painlevé property.

The Dym equation has strong links to the Korteweg–de Vries equation. C.S. Gardner, J.M. Greene, Kruskal and R.M. Miura applied [Dym equation] to the solution of corresponding problem in Korteweg–de Vries equation. The Lax pair of the Harry Dym equation is associated with the Sturm–Liouville operator. The Liouville transformation transforms this operator isospectrally into the Schrödinger operator. Thus by the inverse Liouville transformation solutions of the Korteweg–de Vries equation are transformed into solutions of the Dym equation. An explicit solution of the Dym equation, valid in a finite interval, is found by an auto-Bäcklund transform

$$u(t,x) = \left[ - 3 \alpha \left( x + 4 \alpha^2 t \right) \right]^{2/3} .$$
