= Virasoro group =

Abstract mathematical group

In abstract algebra, the Virasoro group or Bott–Virasoro group (often denoted by Vir) is an infinite-dimensional Lie group defined as the universal central extension of the group of diffeomorphisms of the circle. The corresponding Lie algebra is the Virasoro algebra, which has a key role in conformal field theory (CFT) and string theory.

The group is named after Miguel Ángel Virasoro and Raoul Bott.

== Background ==
An orientation-preserving diffeomorphism of the circle $S^1$, whose points are labelled by a real coordinate $x$ subject to the identification $x\sim x+2\pi$, is a smooth map $f:\mathbb{R}\to\mathbb{R}:x\mapsto f(x)$ such that $f(x+2\pi)=f(x)+2\pi$ and $f'(x)>0$. The set of all such maps spans a group, with multiplication given by the composition of diffeomorphisms. This group is the universal cover of the group of orientation-preserving diffeomorphisms of the circle, denoted as $\widetilde{\text{Diff}}{}^+(S^1)$.

== Definition ==
The Virasoro group is the universal central extension of $\widetilde{\text{Diff}}{}^+(S^1)$. The extension is defined by a specific two-cocycle, which is a real-valued function $\mathsf{C}(f,g)$ of pairs of diffeomorphisms. Specifically, the extension is defined by the Bott–Thurston cocycle:
$$\mathsf{C}(f,g)
\equiv
-\frac{1}{48\pi}\int_0^{2\pi}
\log\big[(f\circ g)'(x)\big]
\frac{g''(x)\,\text{d}x}{g'(x)}.$$
In these terms, the Virasoro group is the set $\widetilde{\text{Diff}}{}^+(S^1)\times\mathbb{R}$ of all pairs $(f,\alpha)$, where $f$ is a diffeomorphism and $\alpha$ is a real number, endowed with the binary operation
$$(f,\alpha)\cdot(g,\beta)
=
\big(f\circ g,\alpha+\beta+\mathsf{C}(f,g)\big).$$
This operation is an associative group operation. This extension is the only central extension of the universal cover of the group of circle diffeomorphisms, up to trivial extensions. The Virasoro group can also be defined without the use explicit coordinates or an explicit choice of cocycle to represent the central extension, via a description the universal cover of the group.

== Virasoro algebra ==
The Lie algebra of the Virasoro group is the Virasoro algebra. As a vector space, the Lie algebra of the Virasoro group consists of pairs $(\xi,\alpha)$, where $\xi=\xi(x)\partial_x$ is a vector field on the circle and $\alpha$ is a real number as before. The vector field, in particular, can be seen as an infinitesimal diffeomorphism $f(x)=x+\epsilon\xi(x)$. The Lie bracket of pairs $(\xi,\alpha)$ then follows from the multiplication defined above, and can be shown to satisfy

$$\big[(\xi,\alpha),(\zeta,\beta)\big]=\bigg([\xi,\zeta],-\frac{1}{24\pi}\int_0^{2\pi}\text{d}x\,\xi(x)\zeta'''(x)\bigg)$$

where the bracket of vector fields on the right-hand side is the usual one: $[\xi,\zeta]=(\xi(x)\zeta'(x)-\zeta(x)\xi'(x))\partial_x$. Upon defining the complex generators
$$L_m\equiv\Big(-ie^{imx}\partial_x,-\frac{i}{24}\delta_{m,0}\Big),
\qquad
Z\equiv (0,-i),$$
the Lie bracket takes the standard textbook form of the Virasoro algebra:
$$[L_m,L_n]
=
(m-n)L_{m+n}+\frac{Z}{12}m(m^2-1)\delta_{m+n}.$$

The generator $Z$ commutes with the whole algebra. Since its presence is due to a central extension, it is subject to a superselection rule which guarantees that, in any physical system having Virasoro symmetry, the operator representing $Z$ is a multiple of the identity. The coefficient in front of the identity is then known as a central charge.

== Properties ==
Since each diffeomorphism $f$ must be specified by infinitely many parameters (for instance the Fourier modes of the periodic function $f(x)-x$), the Virasoro group is infinite-dimensional.

=== Coadjoint representation ===
The Lie bracket of the Virasoro algebra can be viewed as a differential of the adjoint representation of the Virasoro group. Its dual, the coadjoint representation of the Virasoro group, provides the transformation law of a CFT stress tensor under conformal transformations. From this perspective, the Schwarzian derivative in this transformation law emerges as a consequence of the Bott–Thurston cocycle; in fact, the Schwarzian is the so-called Souriau cocycle (referring to Jean-Marie Souriau) associated with the Bott–Thurston cocycle.
