= Toda lattice =

Simple model for one-dimensional crystal in solid-state physics

The Toda lattice, introduced by Morikazu Toda (1967), is a simple model for a one-dimensional crystal in solid state physics. It is famous because it is one of the earliest examples of a non-linear completely integrable system.

It is given by a chain of particles with nearest neighbor interaction, described by the Hamiltonian

$$\begin{align}
H(p,q) &= \sum_{n \in \mathbb{Z}} \left(\frac{p(n,t)^2}{2} +V(q(n+1,t)-q(n,t))\right)
\end{align}$$

and the equations of motion

$$\begin{align}
\frac{d}{dt} p(n,t) &= -\frac{\partial H(p,q)}{\partial q(n,t)} = e^{-(q(n,t) - q(n-1,t))} - e^{-(q(n+1,t) - q(n,t))}, \\
\frac{d}{dt} q(n,t) &= \frac{\partial H(p,q)}{\partial p(n,t)} = p(n,t),
\end{align}$$

where $q(n,t)$ is the displacement of the $n$-th particle from its equilibrium position,

and $p(n,t)$ is its momentum (mass $m=1$),

and the Toda potential $V(r)=e^{-r}+r-1$.

== Soliton solutions ==
Soliton solutions are solitary waves spreading in time with no change to their shape and size and interacting with each other in a particle-like way. The general N-soliton solution of the equation is

$$\begin{align}
q_N(n,t)=q_+ + \log \frac{\det(\mathbb{I}+C_N(n,t))}{\det(\mathbb{I}+C_N(n+1,t))} ,
\end{align}$$

where

$$C_N(n,t)=\Bigg(\frac{\sqrt{\gamma_i(n,t)\gamma_j(n,t)}}{1-e^{\kappa_i+\kappa_j}}\Bigg)_{1<i,j<N},$$

with

$$\gamma_j(n,t)=\gamma_j\,e^{-2\kappa_jn-2\sigma_j\sinh(\kappa_j)t}$$

where $\kappa_j,\gamma_j >0$ and $\sigma_j \in \{\pm 1 \}$.

== Integrability ==
The Toda lattice is a prototypical example of a completely integrable system. To see this one uses Flaschka's variables

$$a(n,t) = \frac{1}{2} {\rm e}^{-(q(n+1,t) - q(n,t))/2}, \qquad b(n,t) = -\frac{1}{2} p(n,t)$$

such that the Toda lattice reads

$$\begin{align}
\dot{a}(n,t) &= a(n,t) \Big(b(n+1,t)-b(n,t)\Big), \\
\dot{b}(n,t) &= 2 \Big(a(n,t)^2-a(n-1,t)^2\Big).
\end{align}$$

To show that the system is completely integrable, it suffices to find a Lax pair, that is, two operators L(t) and P(t) in the Hilbert space of square summable sequences $\ell^2(\mathbb{Z})$ such that the Lax equation

$$\frac{d}{dt} L(t) = [P(t), L(t)]$$

(where [L, P] = LP - PL is the Lie commutator of the two operators) is equivalent to the time derivative of Flaschka's variables. The choice

$$\begin{align}
L(t) f(n) &= a(n,t) f(n+1) + a(n-1,t) f(n-1) + b(n,t) f(n), \\
P(t) f(n) &= a(n,t) f(n+1) - a(n-1,t) f(n-1).
\end{align}$$

where f(n+1) and f(n-1) are the shift operators, implies that the operators L(t) for different t are unitarily equivalent.

The matrix $L(t)$ has the property that its eigenvalues are invariant in time. These eigenvalues constitute independent integrals of motion, therefore the Toda lattice is completely integrable. In particular, the Toda lattice can be solved by virtue of the inverse scattering transform for the Jacobi operator L. The main result implies that arbitrary (sufficiently fast) decaying initial conditions asymptotically for large t split into a sum of solitons and a decaying dispersive part.

== See also ==
- Lax pair
- Lie bialgebra
- Poisson–Lie group
