= Dim, Amur Oblast =

Dim Дим
- Selo
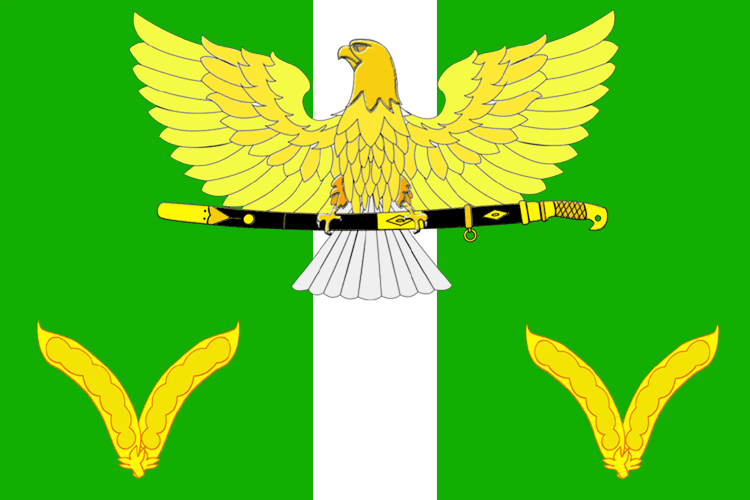
- Flag

- Location within Amur Oblast Location within Russia
- Coordinates: 49°39′N 128°25′E
- Country: Russia
- Region: Amur Oblast
- District: Mikhaylovsky District
- Time zone: UTC+9:00

Dim (Russian: Дим) is a rural locality (a selo) in Dimsky Selsoviet of Mikhaylovsky District, Amur Oblast, Russia. The population was 681 as of 2018. There are 16 streets.

== Geography ==
Dim is located on the right bank of the Dim River, 21 km west of Poyarkovo (the district's administrative centre) by road. Poyarkovo is the nearest rural locality.
