= Dim =

Dimness is a measure of an object's luminosity. Dim or dimness may refer to:

== Computing ==
- .dim, a disk image
- A keyword in most versions of the BASIC programming language

== Chemistry, biology, and medicine ==
- 3,3'-Diindolylmethane, an anticarcinogen compound

== Organizations ==
- Corporación Deportiva Independiente Medellín, a Colombian football club
- Deportivo Independiente Miraflores, a football club based in the city of Miraflores, Lima, Perú
- Dialogue Interreligieux Monastique, the European arm of the DIMMID, a movement promoting interfaith dialogue between monastic communities
- Dirección de Inteligencia Militar, the military intelligence agency of Venezuela

== People ==
- Nickname of John Wooldridge (1919–1958), British film music composer and Second World War bomber pilot

== Places ==
- Dim, Amur Oblast, a rural locality in Amur Oblast, Russia
- Dim, Iran, a village in South Khorasan Province

== Other uses ==
- To dim, verb that means to lower the brightness of light
- Dim, a European rhinoceros beetle in the 1998 Disney/Pixar animated film A Bug's Life
- "DiM", a 1998 episode of Dexter's Laboratory
- Dim (album), the fourth studio album by Japanese rock band The Gazette

The abbreviation dim may refer to:

- Dimension, a measure of how many parameters is sufficient to describe an object in mathematics
  - Dimension (vector space), the number of vectors needed to describe the basis in a vector space, in linear algebra
- Diminished triad, a dissonant chord with a minor third and diminished fifth to the root in music theory
- Diminuendo, a word indicating changes of dynamics in music
- Diminutive, a formation of a word

== See also ==
- Din (disambiguation)
- Global dimming
