= Bloch spectrum =

Concept in quantum mechanics

The Bloch spectrum is a concept in quantum mechanics in the field of theoretical physics; this concept addresses certain energy spectrum considerations. Let H be the one-dimensional Schrödinger equation operator

$$H = - \frac{d^2}{dx^2} + U_\alpha,$$

where U_{α} is a periodic function of period α. The Bloch spectrum of H is defined as the set of values E for which all the solutions of (H − E)φ = 0 are bounded on the whole real axis. The Bloch spectrum consists of the half-line E_{0} < E from which certain closed intervals [E_{2j−1}, E_{2j}] (j = 1, 2, ...) are omitted. These are forbidden bands (or gaps) so the (E_{2j−2}, E_{2j−1}) are allowed bands.
