= Harry Dym =

Israeli mathematician (1938–2024)

- הארי דים
- Born: January 26, 1938
- Died: July 18, 2024 (aged 86)
- Education: Massachusetts Institute of Technology
- Known for: Dym equation
- Relatives: Clive Dym (brother)
- Scientific career
- Fields: Mathematics
- Workplaces: Weizmann Institute of Science
- Doctoral advisor: Henry McKean

Harry Dym (Hebrew: הארי דים; January 26, 1938 – July 18, 2024) was an Israeli-American mathematician at the Weizmann Institute of Science, Israel. Dym's research interests included operator theory, interpolation theory, and inverse problems.

Dym earned his Ph.D. in 1965 from the Massachusetts Institute of Technology, under the supervision of Henry McKean. He introduced the Dym equation, which bears his name.

Dym died on July 18, 2024, at the age of 86.

== Works ==
- as editor with Bernd Fritzsche, Victor Katsnelson, and Bernd Kirstein: Topics in Interpolation Theory, Birkhäuser 1997
- Linear Algebra in Action, American Mathematical Society 2007
- with H. P. McKean: Fourier Series and Integrals, Academic Press 1974
- with H. P. McKean: Gaussian processes, function theory, and the inverse spectral problem, Academic Press 1976, Dover 2008
- $J$ contractive matrix functions, reproducing kernel Hilbert spaces and interpolation, AMS 1989
- as editor: Topics in Analysis and Operator Theory, Birkhäuser 1989
- with Vladimir Bolotnikov: On boundary interpolation for matrix valued Schur functions, AMS 2006
- with Damir Z. Arov: $J$-contractive matrix valued functions and related topics, Cambridge University Press 2008

== Sources ==
- Daniel Alpay, Israel Gohberg, Victor Vinnikov (Herausgeber) Interpolation theory, systems theory, and related topics: the Harry Dym anniversary volume, Birkhäuser 2002.
