= Hodge bundle =

In mathematics, the Hodge bundle, named after W. V. D. Hodge, appears in the study of families of curves, where it provides an invariant in the moduli theory of algebraic curves. Furthermore, it has applications to the theory of modular forms on reductive algebraic groups and string theory.

== Definition ==
Let $\mathcal{M}_g$ be the moduli space of algebraic curves of genus g curves over some scheme. The Hodge bundle $\Lambda_g$ is a vector bundle (Note: Here, "vector bundle" in the sense of quasi-coherent sheaf on an algebraic stack) on $\mathcal{M}_g$ whose fiber at a point C in $\mathcal{M}_g$ is the space of holomorphic differentials on the curve C. To define the Hodge bundle, let $\pi\colon \mathcal{C}_g\rightarrow\mathcal{M}_g$ be the universal algebraic curve of genus g and let $\omega_g$ be its relative dualizing sheaf. The Hodge bundle is the pushforward of this sheaf, i.e.,

$$\Lambda_g=\pi_*\omega_g$$.

== See also ==
- ELSV formula
