= Clive Dym =

American engineer and academic

Clive Dym was a professor emeritus of Engineering Design and also Director of the Center for Design Education at Harvey Mudd College and brother of mathematician Harry Dym. He served as the chair of the engineering department at Harvey Mudd College from 1999 through 2002. He taught at several universities including at Carnegie Mellon University, Stanford University, Northwestern University and University of Southern California. He was a member of the Institute for Defense Analyses and National Academy of Engineering. He was awarded the Gordon Prize in 2012. He earned a BS from Cooper Union in 1962, an MS from Polytechnic Institute of Brooklyn in 1964 and a PhD from Stanford University in 1967. Dym died May 3, 2016.
