= Miguel Ángel Virasoro (physicist) =

Argentine physicist (1940–2021)

- Born: May 9, 1940; Buenos Aires, Argentina
- Died: July 23, 2021 (aged 81); Buenos Aires, Argentina
- Known for: Cavity method Virasoro algebra Virasoro conformal block Virasoro–Shapiro amplitude Virasoro group Virasoro conjecture
- Father: Miguel Ángel Virasoro (philosopher)
- Awards: Enrico Fermi Prize (2009); Dirac Medal (2020)
- Scientific career
- Fields: String theory
- Workplaces: École normale supérieure Istituto Nazionale di Fisica Nucleare; Institute for Advanced Study; University of California, Berkeley; La Sapienza University of Rome; University of Wisconsin–Madison; Weizmann Institute of Science; Ioffe Institute; University of Bonn

Miguel Ángel Virasoro (Spanish: [miˈɣel ˈaŋxel βiɾaˈsoɾo];9 May 1940 – 23 July 2021) was an Argentine (naturalized Italian) mathematician and theoretical physicist. Virasoro worked in Argentina, Israel, the United States, and France, but he spent most of his professional career in Italy at La Sapienza University of Rome. He shared a name with his father, the philosopher Miguel Ángel Virasoro. He was known for his foundational work in string theory, the study of spin glasses, and his research in other areas of mathematical and statistical physics. The Virasoro–Shapiro amplitude, the Virasoro algebra, the super Virasoro algebra, the Virasoro vertex operator algebra, the Virasoro group, the Virasoro conjecture, the Virasoro conformal block, and the Virasoro minimal model are all named after him.

== Biography ==
=== Early life in Argentina ===
Miguel Ángel Virasoro was born in Buenos Aires, Argentina in on May 9, 1940. He shared a name with his father, a noted Argentinian philosopher who founded dialectical existentialism. The younger Virasoro studied physics at the University of Buenos Aires (UBA) from 1958 to 1966. He received his Licenciate degree in 1962 and his PhD in 1966.

=== Research in Israel and the United States ===
In 1966, Virasoro left Argentina after La Noche de los Bastones Largos, a violent dislodging of students and teachers from UBA who opposed the military government of Argentinian General Juan Carlos Onganía. The military dictatorship of Onganía would last from 1966 to 1970. After leaving Argentina, Virasoro worked as a postdoctoral researcher at the Weizmann Institute of Science in Rehovot, Israel until 1968. He then worked at the University of Wisconsin-Madison (UW-M) in the United States until 1969. After his time at UW-M, Virasoro spent another year as a postdoc in the United States at the University of California, Berkeley.

=== Return to Argentina ===
Virasoro returned to Argentina after the end of Juan Carlos Onganía's dictatorship in 1970. In 1971, he accepted a professorship at his alma mater UBA. Virasoro remained at UBA until 1975, at which time he accepted a year-long position at the Institute for Advanced Study in Princeton, New Jersey. Then in 1976, General Jorge Rafael Videla came to power in Argentina and established another military dictatorship. As a result, Virasoro was unable to return to his home country after his year in the United States and instead moved to Europe.

=== Professional career in Europe ===
In Europe, Virasoro took a temporary position at the École normale supérieure in Paris, France in 1976. Virasoro then moved to Italy in 1977 where he worked as a professor at the Istituto Nazionale di Fisica Nucleare at the University of Turin from 1977 until 1981. He then moved to La Sapienza University of Rome, where he remained for thirty years until his Italian retirement and his return to Argentina in 2011. At La Sapienza, Virasoro performed research in mathematical physics, string theory, and statistical mechanics and taught courses on electromagnetism and on physical-mathematical models for economics. He was also a director of the Abdus Salam International Centre for Theoretical Physics (ICTP) in Trieste, Italy from 1995 until 2002.

=== Later years and death ===
In his later years, Virasoro received several awards, honors, and appointments. In 1987, he was awarded a Guggenheim fellowship from the John Simon Guggenheim Memorial Foundation. In 1993, he was awarded the Rammal Award by the French Physical Society. In 1998, he was elected as an international honorary member of the American Academy of Arts and Sciences. In 2009, he was awarded the Enrico Fermi Prize of the Italian Physical Society, which he shared with Greek physicist Dimitri Nanopoulos, for "the discovery of an infinite-dimensional algebra of primary importance for the construction of string theories." In 2020, he was awarded the Dirac Medal of the ICTP, which he shared with French physicists André Neveu and Pierre Ramond, "for their pioneering contributions to the inception and formulation of string theory which introduced new bosonic and fermionic symmetries into physics."

From 2011 until his death, Virasoro was an honorary professor at the Universidad Nacional de General Sarmiento in his home country of Argentina. Virasoro died on July 23, 2021, at the age of 81.

== Research ==
=== String theory ===
Much of Virasoro's early work helped found a branch of theoretical particle physics which would later be understood as string theory. In 1968 while Virasoro was in Israel, his colleague Gabriele Veneziano discovered a formula (the Veneziano amplitude) which described the scattering of open strings. Then in 1969 during his time at University of Wisconsin-Madison, Virasoro successfully generalized Veneziano's theory and discovered a formula (the Virasoro-Shapiro amplitude) which described the scattering of closed strings. At the time, the formulas of Veneziano and Virasoro were understood in terms of so-called dual resonance models. Only later was their work understood to describe strings.

Soon after his discovery of the Virasoro-Shapiro amplitude, Virasoro introduced what became known as the Virasoro algebra. The Virasoro algebra is an infinite-dimensional Lie algebra which describes the conformal symmetry of the worldsheet of a string embedded in spacetime. A supersymmetric generalization of this algebra, the super Virasoro algebra, describes the super conformal symmetry of the worldsheet of a supersymmetric string (or superstring). Pedagogical introductions to the Virasoro-Shapiro amplitude and the Virasoro algebra may be found in David Tong's introductory lectures on string theory.

Several mathematical concepts related to Lie algebras and conformal field theory are named after Virasoro. These include the Virasoro vertex operator algebra, the Virasoro group, the Virasoro conjecture, the Virasoro conformal block, and the Virasoro minimal model.

=== Spin glasses ===
While working in Italy, Virasoro studied spin glasses and other systems in statistical mechanics. Together with Italian physicist Giorgio Parisi and French physicist Marc Mézard, Virasoro discovered the ultrametric organization of low-temperature spin glass states in infinite dimensions.
