= Marchenko equation =

Integral equation

In mathematical physics, more specifically the one-dimensional inverse scattering problem, the Marchenko equation (or Gelfand-Levitan-Marchenko equation or GLM equation), named after Israel Gelfand, Boris Levitan and Volodymyr Marchenko, is derived by computing the Fourier transform of the scattering relation:

$$K(r,r^\prime) + g(r,r^\prime) + \int_r^{\infty} K(r,r^{\prime\prime}) g(r^{\prime\prime},r^\prime) \mathrm{d}r^{\prime\prime} = 0$$

Where $g(r,r^\prime)\,$is a symmetric kernel, such that $g(r,r^\prime)=g(r^\prime,r),\,$which is computed from the scattering data. Solving the Marchenko equation, one obtains the kernel of the transformation operator $K(r,r^\prime)$ from which the potential can be read off. This equation is derived from the Gelfand–Levitan integral equation, using the Povzner–Levitan representation.

== Application to scattering theory ==
Suppose that for a potential $u(x)$ for the Schrödinger operator $L = -\frac{d^2}{dx^2} + u(x)$, one has the scattering data $(r(k), \{\chi_1, \cdots, \chi_N\})$, where $r(k)$ are the reflection coefficients from continuous scattering, given as a function $r: \mathbb{R} \rightarrow \mathbb{C}$, and the real parameters $\chi_1, \cdots, \chi_N > 0$ are from the discrete bound spectrum.

Then defining
$$F(x) = \sum_{n=1}^N\beta_ne^{-\chi_n x} + \frac{1}{2\pi} \int_\mathbb{R}r(k)e^{ikx}dk,$$
where the $\beta_n$ are non-zero constants, solving the GLM equation
$$K(x,y) + F(x+y) + \int_x^\infty K(x,z) F(z+y) dz = 0$$
for $K$ allows the potential to be recovered using the formula
$$u(x) = -2 \frac{d}{dx}K(x,x).$$

== See also ==
- Lax pair
