= Lax pair =

Matrices satisfying a differential equation

In mathematics, in the theory of integrable systems, a Lax pair is a pair of time-dependent matrices or operators that satisfy a corresponding differential equation, called the Lax equation. Lax pairs were introduced by Peter Lax to discuss solitons in continuous media. The inverse scattering transform makes use of the Lax equations to solve such systems.

== Definition ==
A Lax pair is a pair of matrices or operators $L(t), P(t)$ dependent on time, acting on a fixed Hilbert space, and satisfying Lax's equation:

$$\frac{dL}{dt} = [P, L],$$

where $[P, L] = PL - LP$ is the commutator. Often, as in the example below, $P$ depends on $L$ in a prescribed way, so this is a nonlinear equation for $L$ as a function of $t$.

== Isospectral property ==
It can then be shown that the eigenvalues and more generally the spectrum of L are independent of t. The matrices/operators L are said to be isospectral as $t$ varies.

The core observation is that the matrices $L(t)$ are all similar by virtue of

$$L(t) = U(t, s) L(s) U(t, s)^{-1},$$

where $U(t, s)$ is the solution of the Cauchy problem

$$\frac{d}{dt} U(t, s) = P(t) U(t, s), \quad U(s, s) = I,$$

where I denotes the identity matrix. Note that if P(t) is skew-adjoint, U(t, s) will be unitary.

In other words, to solve the eigenvalue problem Lψ = λψ at time t, it is possible to solve the same problem at time 0, where L is generally known better, and to propagate the solution with the following formulas:

$\lambda(t) = \lambda(0)$ (no change in spectrum),
$$\frac{\partial \psi}{\partial t} = P \psi.$$

=== Through principal invariants ===
The result can also be shown using the invariants $\operatorname{tr}(L^n)$ for any $n$. These satisfy
$$\frac{d}{dt} \operatorname{tr}(L^n) = 0$$
due to the Lax equation, and since the characteristic polynomial can be written in terms of these traces, the spectrum is preserved by the flow.

=== Link with the inverse scattering method ===
The above property is the basis for the inverse scattering method. In this method, L and P act on a functional space (thus ψ = ψ(t, x)) and depend on an unknown function u(t, x) which is to be determined. It is generally assumed that u(0, x) is known, and that P does not depend on u in the scattering region where $\|x\| \to \infty.$ The method then takes the following form:

1. Compute the spectrum of $L(0)$, giving $\lambda$ and $\psi(0, x).$
2. In the scattering region where $P$ is known, propagate $\psi$ in time by using $\frac{\partial \psi}{\partial t}(t, x) = P \psi(t, x)$ with initial condition $\psi(0, x).$
3. Knowing $\psi$ in the scattering region, compute $L(t)$ and/or $u(t, x).$

=== Spectral curve ===
If the Lax matrix additionally depends analytically on a complex parameter $z$ (as is the case for, say, sine-Gordon), and the deformation is isospectral, the equation
$$\det\big(wI - L(z)\big) = 0,$$
defines an analytic subset of $\mathbb{C}^2$ with coordinates $w, z,$ which under suitable hypotheses is a curve, often after removing singularities. By the isospectral property, this curve is preserved under time translation. This is called the spectral curve, often after taking a suitable compactification. When the dependence of L on z is algebraic, it is an algebraic curve. Such curves appear in the theory of Hitchin systems.

== Zero-curvature representation ==
Any PDE which admits a Lax-pair representation also admits a zero-curvature representation. In fact, the zero-curvature representation is more general and for other integrable PDEs, such as the sine-Gordon equation, the Lax pair refers to matrices that satisfy the zero-curvature equation rather than the Lax equation. Furthermore, the zero-curvature representation makes the link between integrable systems and geometry manifest, culminating in Ward's programme to formulate known integrable systems as solutions to the anti-self-dual Yang–Mills (ASDYM) equations.

=== Zero-curvature equation ===
The zero-curvature equations are described by a pair of matrix-valued functions $A_x(x, t), A_t(x, t),$ where the subscripts denote coordinate indices rather than derivatives. Often the $(x, t)$ dependence is through a single scalar function $\varphi(x, t)$ and its derivatives. The zero-curvature equation is then
$$\partial_t A_x - \partial_x A_t + [A_x, A_t] = 0.$$
It is so called as it corresponds to the vanishing of the curvature tensor, which in this case is $F_{\mu\nu} = [\partial_\mu - A_\mu, \partial_\nu - A_\nu] = -\partial_\mu A_\nu + \partial_\nu A_\mu + [A_\mu, A_\nu]$. This differs from the conventional expression by some minus signs, which are ultimately unimportant.

=== Lax pair to zero-curvature ===
For an eigensolution to the Lax operator $L$, one has
$$L\psi = \lambda \psi, \psi_t + A\psi = 0.$$
If we instead enforce these, together with time independence of $\lambda$, instead the Lax equation arises as a consistency equation for an overdetermined system.

The Lax pair $(L, P)$ can be used to define the connection components $(A_x, A_t)$. When a PDE admits a zero-curvature representation but not a Lax equation representation, the connection components $(A_x, A_t)$ are referred to as the Lax pair, and the connection as a Lax connection.

== Examples ==
=== Korteweg–de Vries equation ===
The Korteweg–de Vries equation

$$u_t = 6uu_x - u_{xxx}$$

can be reformulated as the Lax equation

$$L_t = [P, L]$$

with

$L = -\partial_x^2 + u$ (a Sturm–Liouville operator),
$$P = -4\partial_x^3 + 6u\partial_x + 3u_x,$$

where all derivatives act on all objects to the right. This accounts for the infinite number of first integrals of the KdV equation.

=== Kovalevskaya top ===
The previous example used an infinite-dimensional Hilbert space. Examples are also possible with finite-dimensional Hilbert spaces. These include Kovalevskaya top and the generalization to include an electric field $\vec{h}$.

$$\begin{align}
L &= \begin{pmatrix}
g_1 + h_2 & g_2 + h_1 & g_3 & h_3\\
g_2 + h_1 & -g_1 + h_2 & h_3 & -g_3\\
g_3 & h_3 & -g_1 - h_2 & g_2 - h_1\\
h_3 & -g_3 & g_2 - h_1 & g_1 + h_2\\
\end{pmatrix} \lambda^{-1}\\
&+ \begin{pmatrix}
0 & 0 & -l_2 & -l_1\\
0 & 0 & l_1 & -l_2\\
l_2 & -l_1 & -2 \lambda & -2 l_3 \\
l_1 & l_2 & 2 l_3 & 2 \lambda\\
\end{pmatrix},
\\
P &= \frac{-1}{2} \begin{pmatrix}
0 & -2 l_3 & l_2 & l_1\\
2 l_3 & 0 & -l_1 & l_2\\
-l_2 & l_1 & 2 \lambda & 2 l_3 + \gamma\\
-l_1 & -l_2 & -2 l_3 & -2\lambda\\
\end{pmatrix}.
\end{align}$$

=== Heisenberg picture ===
In the Heisenberg picture of quantum mechanics, an observable A without explicit time t dependence satisfies

$$\frac{d}{dt} A(t) = \frac{i}{\hbar} [H, A(t)],$$

with H the Hamiltonian and ħ the reduced Planck constant. Aside from a factor, observables (without explicit time dependence) in this picture can thus be seen to form Lax pairs together with the Hamiltonian. The Schrödinger picture is then interpreted as the alternative expression in terms of isospectral evolution of these observables.

=== Further examples ===
Further examples of systems of equations that can be formulated as a Lax pair include:

- Benjamin–Ono equation
- One-dimensional cubic non-linear Schrödinger equation
- Davey–Stewartson system
- Integrable systems with contact Lax pairs
- Kadomtsev–Petviashvili equation
- Korteweg–de Vries equation
- KdV hierarchy
- Marchenko equation
- Modified Korteweg–de Vries equation
- Sine-Gordon equation
- Toda lattice
- Lagrange, Euler, and Kovalevskaya tops
- Belinski–Zakharov transform, in general relativity.

The last is remarkable, as it implies that both the Schwarzschild metric and the Kerr metric can be understood as solitons.

==== Discrete time dynamics ====
The concept of Lax pair can also be defined for dynamical systems with discrete time, for instance the pentagram map.
