= Miguel Ángel Virasoro (philosopher) =

Argentine philosopher (1900–1966)

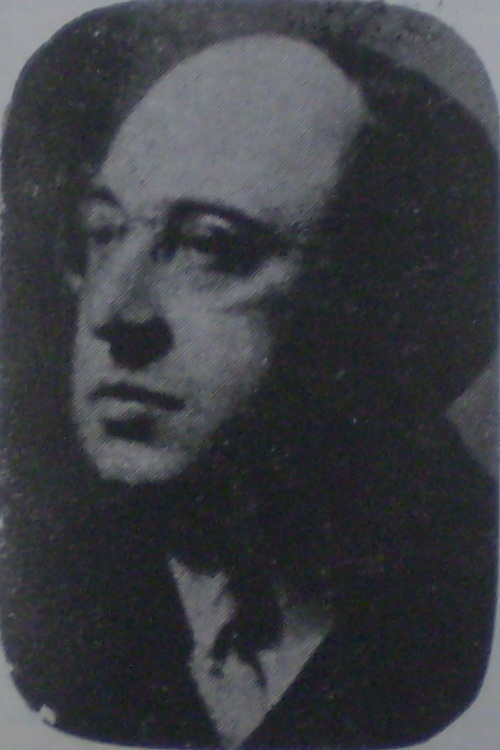
- Miguel Ángel Virasoro (Philosopher)
- Born: April 9, 1900. Santa Fe, Argentina
- Died: June 29, 1966 (aged 66); Buenos Aires, Argentina
- Occupation: Philosopher
- Children: Miguel Ángel Virasoro (physicist)

Miguel Ángel Virasoro (1900–1966) was an Argentine philosopher.

== Life ==
Born in Santa Fe, Argentina, in 1900, Virasoro graduated with a law degree from the University of La Plata.

In 1947 he took over the direction of the magazine Logos | Report which resulted in the same year which still remains the best version of Being and Nothingness Sartre into Castilian. In 1949, Virasoro participated in the first National Congress of Philosophy held in Mendoza with a presentation dialectical existentialism. In 1952 he was appointed vice dean of the Faculty of Philosophy and also takes over the leadership of the Department of Philosophy. In 1954 he took over the Argentine Institute of Thought. In 1955 he was expelled for political reasons since 1960 began teaching at several universities in the interior, especially the de Cuyo, in an intense and fruitful activity until his death in 1966. His work earned lofty concepts both at home and abroad, of Benedetto Croce, Alejandro Korn, among others.

He had a son of the same name, who would become a prominent theoretical physicist and whose work contributed to the development of string theory.

== Philosophical work ==
Like many men from his generation came to philosophy through the paths of the academy but for a personal tour of self, an impulse that internal vocation personally selected readings tone of the spiritual atmosphere of the time . He belonged to the generation of 1925, not only by chronology, but also by the philosophical orientation which shaped his thinking at a time with all the enthusiasm and fervor of his youth were part of this age group Astrada, Fatone, Vasallo, Lugones, Borges and others reacted against the positivist and pragmatic features that printed in politics and culture of Argentina. Virasoro himself defined his generation as one that "For the first time in our history is outlined with sufficient spiritual inner life as to feel determined to an ideal of disinterested culture ...".These first works that addressed the issue of culture is a valuable contribution to the study of our modern American consciousness "in the words of Guglielmini, editor of the Early and prologue of his first book A Theory of Self and Culture (1928) that worth the National Prize of Culture and opens the doors of a university professorship. Since then begins to serve as professor in the chair of modern and contemporary philosophy of the UBA.

The thought of Virasoro enrolled in the current existentialist revolves around the existential problem in a form of arming go through an intermittent dialogue with Hegel, Heidegger, Nietzsche and often with Eastern philosophy. An armed thinking in dialogue, which is a welcome and a synthesis-oriented reject Hegel, Heidegger notoriously Nietzschean inspiration, whose expression is what he calls "dialectical existentialism. (Existentialism dialectical, 1958) dialectical Existentialism is a correction of Hegel, the slogan deslogizar because the dialectic is based on the existence whose principle is freedom.

In Hegel's Logic (1932), argues that the Hegelian dialectic prefix a field of possibilities that makes the spirit where mechanized activity becoming, rather than an open possibility, diluted as a closed circle of eternal return, and excludes any desire to affair and conquering one's virtue is philosophical. Against this stands the active nature of the spirit that is always right and will, vital impulse of life but does not deny the claims, but does not repress the instincts that leads to full empowerment. But unlike Nietzsche who agrees with this reassessment of the vital forces, proposed ranking them according to their greater or lesser contribution to the implementation of the spirit and therefore the reverse, "he says of what is happening in contemporary society. This understanding of the dialectical method allows you to recover the right of difference that can not be reduced to the formalism of the synthesis of opposites. While on the ground the outline of competitions, you can not capture the richness of difference.This requires that thought out of itself, requires the intuition that takes the concept of the static tautological. (The metaphysical intuition, 1965) From this perspective the dialectic of opposites becomes existential dialectic, then march toward the concrete, the existence, in which the overcoming of opposites is impossible. In this area, the contradictions are insoluble when overcome in Hegel appears as reconciliation of opposites guaranteed by the necessary evolution, is given here as hiatus, the qualitative leap forward is the land of paradox where opposites coexist, land and carved by Kierkegaard. (Freedom, existence and being, 1942) Thus anchor their thinking in Heidegger for whom consciousness is not something theoretical but emotional. "temple of spirit", "pre-understanding" original predisposition to anxiety, which is not form but content and not of conscience but of existence. But here again Virasoro corrected: the original is not anxiety born of the awareness of finitude, that which in Sartre and Kierkegaard is expressed as limited awareness of this in every election. Anxiety is just another aspect of the deeper phenomenon that contains: the thirst for being, "anxiety", force or impulse that is being itself as an abstract possibility. A conception of being as opposed substance as the impetus, a pure will to be where he does not play any type of need. Freedom, but freedom to be held in permanent tension and implies a sense of being as pure possibility that is actualized in the form of a quota want individual and limited, as the abstract universal being as impotent and needs the body to perform. Major works

== Bibliography ==
- 1928: A theory of self as a culture, Buenos Aires, Gleizer.
- 1932: The Logic of Hegel, Buenos Aires, Glei;zer.
- 1942: The freedom, the existence and being, University of Buenos Aires.
- 1963: For a new idea of man and philosophical anthropology, Cuadernos de Humanitas, National University of Tucuman.
- 1965: The Metaphysical intuition, Buenos Aires, Carlos Lohlé. Philosophical Journal

=== Articles and reviews ===
- 1952: My philosophy, Mendoza, in Philosophia No. 17.
- 1954: Existence and world, Logos No. 10-11, University of Buenos Aires.1958: Existentialism dialectical Humanitas, Universidad Nacional de Tucumán
- 1952: My philosophy, Mendoza, Philosophia No. 17, 1952
- 1954: Existence and the world, Logos No. 10-11, University of Buenos Aires.
- 1961: Philosophy in Argentina 1930-1960, Buenos Aires, Sur.
- 1961: "Being as momentum and self-creation, Mendoza, Philosophia No. 24, 1
- -Possibility of Metaphysics, Cuadernos de Humanitas, National University of Tucuman.
- -Coming Superman (Test of prophetic philosophy), Humanitas No. 14, National University of Tucuman. –
- Philosophy, Argentina 1930-1960, Buenos Aires, Sur. Virasoro Bibliography:
- Alberto Buela, Miguel Angel Virasoro in Thought in rupture, Theoria, 2008.
- Alberto Caturelli A., "From my correspondence with Miguel Angel Virasoro," in Philosophia Mendoza, 1967.
- J. Chaki, "Ideas anthropological Miguel Angel Virasoro," in Philosophia, Mendoza 1967.
- C.Belts, "History of existentialism in Argentina," Cuadernos de Filosofía 4, Buenos Aires, 1994.
- A. Coviello, "A page of history in the emerging philosophy of Argentina and other trials," Septentrion Group, Tucumán, 1942.
- A. Fornari, "Miguel Angel Virasoro and the metaphysical foundation of subjectivity as a historical legacy for the philosophy Argentina", in Stromata 40, Buenos Aires, 1984.
- Luis Farre, Fifty years of philosophy in Argentina, Peuser, Buenos Aires 1958.
- Luis Farre, Philosophy in Argentina, Docencia, Buenos Aires 1981.
- JA García Martínez, Miguel Angel Virasoro: "The freedom, the existence and being, in South [Buenos Aires], November (1943).
- M. Gonzalo Casas, Miguel A. Virasoro, North University Tucumán, 15 (1955).
- Rosa Licata: "Man and society in the thought of Miguel Angel Virasoro" in Cuyo: Yearbook of American Philosophy and Argentina, Mendoza, 1996.
- "Ethics Miguel Angel Virasoro ontological" in Cuyo, Vol 2, Year 1985-1986. "
- E. Nieto, "The freedom, the existence and dialectics.Around the philosophy of Miguel Angel Virasoro, "in University 18, Santa Fe, 1945.
- Mónica Virasoro, "Existentialism dialectical of Miguel A. Virasoro, "in Philosophical Thought Novenas Jornadas Argentino FEPAI, Buenos Aires 2001.
