= Virasoro conjecture =

In algebraic geometry, the Virasoro conjecture states that a certain generating function encoding Gromov–Witten invariants of a smooth projective variety is fixed by an action of half of the Virasoro algebra. The Virasoro conjecture is named after theoretical physicist Miguel Ángel Virasoro. Tohru Eguchi, Kentaro Hori, and Chuan-Sheng Xiong (1997) proposed the Virasoro conjecture as a generalization of Witten's conjecture. Ezra Getzler (1999) gave a survey of the Virasoro conjecture.

The proof of the genus 0 Virasoro conjecture for all smooth projective varieties (or more generally, compact symplectic manifolds) was first given by Xiaobo Liu and Gang Tian (1998).
