= Witten conjecture =

Conjecture in algebraic geometry

In algebraic geometry, the Witten conjecture is a conjecture about intersection numbers of stable classes on the moduli space of curves, introduced by Edward Witten in the paper Witten (1991), and generalized in Witten (1993). Witten's original conjecture was proved by Maxim Kontsevich in the paper Kontsevich (1992).

Witten's motivation for the conjecture was that two different models of 2-dimensional quantum gravity should have the same partition function. The partition function for one of these models can be described in terms of intersection numbers on the moduli stack of algebraic curves, and the partition function for the other is the logarithm of the τ-function of the KdV hierarchy. Identifying these partition functions gives Witten's conjecture that a certain generating function formed from intersection numbers should satisfy the differential equations of the KdV hierarchy.

== Statement ==
Suppose that M_{g,n} is the moduli stack of compact Riemann surfaces of genus g with n distinct marked points x_{1},...,x_{n}, and M̅_{g,n} is its Deligne–Mumford compactification. There are n line bundles L_{i} on M̅_{g,n}, whose fiber at a point of the moduli stack is given by the cotangent space of a Riemann surface at the marked point x_{i}. The intersection index 〈τ_{d_{1}}, ..., τ_{d_{n}}〉 is the intersection index of Π c_{1}(L_{i})^{d_{i}} on M̅_{g,n} where Σd_{i} = dimM̅_{g,n} = 3g – 3 + n, and 0 if no such g exists, where c_{1} is the first Chern class of a line bundle. Witten's generating function

$$F(t_0,t_1,\ldots)
= \sum\langle\tau_0^{k_0}\tau_1^{k_1}\cdots\rangle\prod_{i\ge 0} \frac{t_i^{k_i}}{k_i!}
=\frac{t_0^3}{6}+ \frac{t_1}{24} + \frac{t_0t_2}{24} + \frac{t_1^2}{24}+ \frac{t_0^2t_3}{48} + \cdots$$

encodes all the intersection indices as its coefficients.

Witten's conjecture states that the partition function Z = exp F is a τ-function for the KdV hierarchy, in other words it satisfies a certain series of partial differential equations corresponding to the basis $\{L_{-1}, L_0, L_1,\ldots\}$ of the Virasoro algebra.

== Proof ==
Kontsevich used a combinatorial description of the moduli spaces in terms of ribbon graphs to show that

$$\sum_{d_1+\cdots+d_n=3g-3+n}\langle \tau_{d_1},\ldots,\tau_{d_n}\rangle  \prod_{1\le i\le n} \frac{(2d_i-1)!!}{\lambda_i^{2d_i+1}}
=\sum_{\Gamma\in G_{g,n}}\frac{2^{-|X_0|}}{|\text{Aut} \Gamma|}\prod_{e\in X_1}\frac{2}{\lambda(e)}$$

Here the sum on the right is over the set G_{g,n} of ribbon graphs X of compact Riemann surfaces of genus g with n marked points. The set of edges e and points of X are denoted by X_{0} and X_{1}. The function λ is thought of as a function from the marked points to the reals, and extended to edges of the ribbon graph by setting λ of an edge equal to the sum of λ at the two marked points corresponding to each side of the edge.

By Feynman diagram techniques, this implies that F(t_{0},...) is an asymptotic expansion of

$$\log\int \exp(i \text{tr} X^3/6)d\mu$$

as Λ tends to infinity, where Λ and Χ are positive definite N by N hermitian matrices, and t_{i} is given by

$$t_i = \frac{- \text{tr } \Lambda^{-1-2i}}{1\times3\times5\times\cdots\times (2i-1)}$$

and the probability measure μ on the positive definite hermitian matrices is given by

$$d\mu =c_\Lambda\exp(-\text{tr} X^2\Lambda/2)dX$$

where c_{Λ} is a normalizing constant. This measure has the property that

$$\int X_{ij}X_{kl}d\mu = \delta_{il}\delta_{jk}\frac{2}{\Lambda_i+\Lambda_j}$$

which implies that its expansion in terms of Feynman diagrams is the expression for F in terms of ribbon graphs.

From this he deduced that exp F is a τ-function for the KdV hierarchy, thus proving Witten's conjecture.

== Generalizations ==
The Witten conjecture is a special case of a more general relation between integrable systems of Hamiltonian PDEs and the geometry of certain families of 2D topological field theories (axiomatized in the form of the so-called cohomological field theories by Kontsevich and Manin), which was explored and studied systematically by B. Dubrovin and Y. Zhang, A. Givental, C. Teleman and others.

The Virasoro conjecture is a generalization of the Witten conjecture.
