= Moduli of algebraic curves =

Geometric space

The classical moduli space of elliptic curves is the quotient of the upper half plane by the modular group. A fundamental domain for that action is shaded; the moduli space is that domain, after edges have been suitably identified and compactified.

In algebraic geometry, a moduli space of curves is a space whose points correspond to isomorphism classes of algebraic curves. The term "modulus" was introduced for this purpose by Bernhard Riemann, and means "parameter"; thus a "moduli space" means a space giving parameters that specify all of the curves of a given kind. With a moduli space, instead of studying one curve at a time, one studies all curves of a given kind as members of a single geometric family. The moduli space of curves (of a given kind) is a special case of the more general notion moduli space, which gives a parameter space for other kinds of objects (curves, surfaces, etc).

Different choices of conditions lead to different moduli spaces. For example, one may fix the genus, allow only smooth or also certain singular curves, or include marked points. Depending on the problem, the moduli object may be constructed as a scheme, an algebraic space, or more naturally as an algebraic stack. In many cases there is both a coarse moduli space, which records isomorphism classes of curves, and a finer stack that also keeps track of their automorphisms.

A well-studied example is the moduli of smooth projective curves of genus $g$. Over the field of complex numbers, these correspond to compact Riemann surfaces. Classically, the (coarse) moduli space of genus $g=1$ curves having a marked point (elliptic curve groups) is the (classical) modular curve. For $g>1$, the moduli stack of smooth curves is denoted $\mathcal{M}_g$, and its compactification by stable nodal curves is denoted $\overline{\mathcal{M}}_g$. These spaces and stacks play a central role in algebraic geometry, Teichmüller theory, and the theory of modular forms.

== Moduli stacks of stable curves ==
The moduli stack $\mathcal{M}_{g}$ classifies families of smooth projective curves, together with their isomorphisms. When $g > 1$, this stack may be compactified by adding new "boundary" points which correspond to stable nodal curves (together with their isomorphisms). A curve is stable if it is complete, connected, has no singularities other than double points, and has only a finite group of automorphisms. The resulting stack is denoted $\overline{\mathcal{M}}_{g}$. Both moduli stacks carry universal families of curves.

Both stacks above have dimension $3g-3$; hence a stable nodal curve can be completely specified by choosing the values of $3g-3$ parameters, when $g > 1$. In lower genus, one must account for the presence of smooth families of automorphisms, by subtracting their number. There is exactly one equivalence class of complex curves of genus zero, namely the Riemann sphere, and its group of automorphisms is PGL(2). Hence the dimension of $\mathcal{M}_0$ is equal to

$$\begin{align}\dim(\text{space of genus 0 curves}) - \dim(\text{group of automorphisms})  &= 0 - \dim(\mathrm{PGL}(2))\\
&= -3 .\end{align}$$

Likewise, in genus 1, there is a one-dimensional space of curves, but every such curve has a one-dimensional group of automorphisms. Hence, the stack $\mathcal{M}_1$ has dimension 0.

=== Construction and irreducibility ===
It is a non-trivial theorem, proved by Pierre Deligne and David Mumford, that the moduli stack $\mathcal{M}_g$ is irreducible, meaning it cannot be expressed as the union of two proper substacks. They prove this by analyzing the locus $H_g$ of stable curves in the Hilbert scheme $\mathrm{Hilb}_{\mathbb{P}^{5g - 5 -1}}^{P_g(n)}$ of tri-canonically embedded curves (from the embedding of the very ample $\omega_C^{\otimes 3}$ for every curve) which have Hilbert polynomial $P_g(n) = (6n-1)(g-1)$. Then, the stack $[H_g / \mathrm{PGL}(5g-6)]$ is a construction of the moduli space $\mathcal{M}_g$. Using deformation theory, Deligne and Mumford show this stack is smooth and use the stack of isomorphisms between stable curves $\mathrm{Isom}_S(C,C')$, to show that $\mathcal{M}_g$ has finite stabilizers, hence it is a Deligne–Mumford stack. Moreover, they find a stratification of $H_g$ as

$$H_g^o \coprod H_{g,1} \coprod \cdots \coprod H_{g,n}$$,

where $H_g^o$ is the subscheme of smooth stable curves and $H_{g,i}$ is an irreducible component of $S^* = H_g \setminus H_g^o$. They analyze the components of $\mathcal{M}_g^0 = H_g^0/\mathrm{PGL}(5g-6)$ (as a GIT quotient). If there existed multiple components of $H_g^o$, none of them would be complete. Also, any component of $H_g$ must contain non-singular curves. Consequently, the singular locus $S^*$ is connected, hence it is contained in a single component of $H_g$. Furthermore, because every component intersects $S^*$, all components must be contained in a single component, hence the coarse space $H_g$ is irreducible. From the general theory of algebraic stacks, this implies the stack quotient $\mathcal{M}_g$ is irreducible.

=== Properness ===
Properness, or compactness for orbifolds, follows from a theorem on stable reduction on curves. This can be found using a theorem of Grothendieck regarding the stable reduction of Abelian varieties, and showing its equivalence to the stable reduction of curves.^{section 5.2}

=== Coarse moduli spaces ===
One can also consider the coarse moduli spaces representing isomorphism classes of smooth or stable curves. These coarse moduli spaces were actually studied before the notion of moduli stack was introduced. In fact, the idea of a moduli stack was introduced by Deligne and Mumford in an attempt to prove the projectivity of the coarse moduli spaces. In recent years, it has become apparent that the stack of curves is actually the more fundamental object.

The coarse moduli spaces have the same dimension as the stacks when $g > 1$; however, in genus zero the coarse moduli space has dimension zero, and in genus one, it has dimension one.

== Examples of low genus moduli spaces ==
=== Genus 0 ===
Determining the geometry of the moduli space of genus $0$ curves can be established by using deformation theory. The number of moduli for a genus $0$ curve, e.g. $\mathbb{P}^1$, is given by the cohomology group

$H^1(C,T_C)$

With Serre duality this cohomology group is isomorphic to

$$\begin{align}
H^1(C,T_C) &\cong H^0(C, \omega_C\otimes T_C^\vee) \\
&\cong H^0(C, \omega_C^{\otimes 2})
\end{align}$$

for the dualizing sheaf $\omega_C$. But, using Riemann–Roch shows the degree of the canonical bundle is $-2$, so the degree of $\omega_C^{\otimes 2}$ is $-4$, hence there are no global sections, meaning

$H^0(C,\omega_C^{\otimes 2}) = 0$

showing there are no deformations of genus $0$ curves. This proves $\mathcal{M}_0$ is just a single point, and the only genus $0$ curves are given by $\mathbb{P}^1$. The only technical difficulty is the automorphism group of $\mathbb{P}^1$ is the algebraic group $\text{PGL}(2,\mathbb{C})$, which rigidifies once three points on $\mathbb{P}^1$ are fixed, so most authors take $\mathcal{M}_0$ to mean $\mathcal{M}_{0,3}$.

=== Genus 1 ===
The genus 1 case is one of the first well-understood cases of moduli spaces, at least over the complex numbers, because isomorphism classes of elliptic curves are classified by the J-invariant

$j: \mathcal{M}_{1,1}|_{\mathbb{C}} \to \mathbb{A}^1_\mathbb{C}$

where $\mathcal{M}_{1,1}|_{\mathbb{C}}=\mathcal{M}_{1,1}\times_{\text{Spec}(\mathbb{Z})} \text{Spec}(\mathbb{C})$. Topologically, $\mathcal{M}_{1,1}|_{\mathbb{C}}$ is just the affine line, but it can be compactified to a stack with underlying topological space $\mathbb{P}^1_\mathbb{C}$ by adding a stable curve at infinity. This is an elliptic curve with a single cusp. The construction of the general case over $\text{Spec}(\mathbb{Z})$ was originally completed by Deligne and Rapoport.

Note that most authors consider the case of genus one curves with one marked point as the origin of the group since otherwise the stabilizer group in a hypothetical moduli space $\mathcal{M}_1$ would have stabilizer group at the point $[C] \in \mathcal{M}_1$ given by the curve, since elliptic curves have an Abelian group structure. This adds unneeded technical complexity to this hypothetical moduli space. On the other hand, $\mathcal{M}_{1,1}$ is a smooth Deligne–Mumford stack.

=== Genus 2 ===
==== Affine parameter space ====
In genus 2 it is a classical result that all such curves are hyperelliptic,^{pg 298} so the moduli space can be determined completely from the branch locus of the curve using the Riemann–Hurwitz formula. Since an arbitrary genus 2 curve is given by a polynomial of the form

$$y^2 - x(x-1)(x-a)(x-b)(x-c)$$

for some uniquely defined $a,b,c \in \mathbb{A}^1$, the parameter space for such curves is given by

$$\mathbb{A}^3 \setminus (\Delta_{a,b} \cup \Delta_{a,c} \cup \Delta_{b,c}),$$

where $\Delta_{i,j}$ corresponds to the locus $i \neq j$.

==== Weighted projective space ====
Using a weighted projective space and the Riemann–Hurwitz formula, a hyperelliptic curve can be described as a polynomial of the form

$$z^2 = ax^6 + bx^5y + cx^4y^2 + dx^3y^3 + ex^2y^4 + fxy^5 + gy^6 ,$$

where $a,\ldots,f$ are parameters for sections of $\Gamma(\mathbb{P}(3,1), \mathcal{O}(g))$. Then, the locus of sections which contain no triple root contains every curve $C$ represented by a point $[C]\in \mathcal{M}_2$.

=== Genus 3 ===
This is the first moduli space of curves which has both a hyperelliptic locus and a non-hyperelliptic locus. The non-hyperelliptic curves are all given by plane curves of degree 4 (using the genus degree formula), which are parameterized by the smooth locus in the Hilbert scheme of hypersurfaces

$$\operatorname{Hilb}_{\mathbb{P}^2}^{8t-4} \cong \mathbb{P}^{\binom{6}{4} - 1}$$.

Then, the moduli space is stratified by the substacks

$$\mathcal{M}_3 = [H_2/\mathrm{PGL}(3))] \coprod \mathcal{M}_3^{\mathrm{hyp}}$$.

== Birational geometry ==
=== Unirationality conjecture ===
In all of the previous cases, the moduli spaces can be found to be unirational, meaning there exists a dominant rational morphism

$\mathbb{P}^n \to \mathcal{M}_g$

and it was long expected this would be true in all genera. In fact, Severi had proved this to be true for genera up to $10$. Although, it turns out that for genus $g \geq 23$ all such moduli spaces are of general type, meaning they are not unirational. They accomplished this by studying the Kodaira dimension of the coarse moduli spaces

$$\kappa_g = \mathrm{Kod}(\overline{\mathcal{M}}_{g}),$$

and found $\kappa_g > 0$ for $g \geq 23$. In fact, for $g > 23$,

$$\kappa_g = 3g - 3 = \dim(\mathcal{M}_g),$$

and hence $\mathcal{M}_g$ is of general type.

==== Geometric implication ====
This is significant geometrically because it implies any linear system on a ruled variety cannot contain the universal curve $\mathcal{C}_g$.

== Stratification of boundary ==
The moduli space $\overline{\mathcal{M}}_{g}$ has a natural stratification on the boundary $\partial\overline{\mathcal{M}}_{g}$ whose points represent singular genus $g$ curves. It decomposes into strata

$$\partial\overline{\mathcal{M}}_{g} = \coprod_{0 \leq h \leq (g/2)} \Delta_h^*$$,

where

- $\Delta_h^* \cong \overline{\mathcal{M}}_{h} \times \overline{\mathcal{M}}_{g-h}$ for $1 \leq h < g/2$.
- $\Delta_0^* \cong \overline{\mathcal{M}}_{g-1,2} / (\Z/2)$ where the action permutes the two marked points.
- $\Delta_{g/2} \cong (\overline{\mathcal{M}}_{g/2} \times \overline{\mathcal{M}}_{g/2}) / (\Z/2)$ whenever $g$ is even.

The curves lying above these loci correspond to

- A pair of curves $C, C'$ connected at a double point.
- The normalization of a genus $g$ curve at a single double point singularity.
- A pair of curves of the same genus connected at a double point up to permutation.

=== Stratification for genus 2 ===
For the genus $2$ case, there is a stratification given by

$$\begin{align}
\partial \overline{\mathcal{M}}_2 &= \Delta_0^* \coprod \Delta_1^* \\
&= \overline{\mathcal{M}}_{1,2}/(\Z/2)
\coprod
(\overline{\mathcal{M}}_1\times \overline{\mathcal{M}}_1)/(\Z/2)
\end{align}$$.

Further analysis of these strata can be used to give the generators of the Chow ring $A^*(\overline{\mathcal{M}}_2)$ ^{proposition 9.1}.

== Moduli of marked curves ==
One can also enrich the problem by considering the moduli stack of genus g nodal curves with n marked points, pairwise distinct and distinct from the nodes. Such marked curves are said to be stable if the subgroup of curve automorphisms which fix the marked points is finite. The resulting moduli stacks of smooth (or stable) genus g curves with n marked points are denoted $\mathcal{M}_{g,n}$ (or $\overline{\mathcal{M}}_{g,n}$), and have dimension $3g-3 + n$.

A case of particular interest is the moduli stack $\overline{\mathcal{M}}_{1,1}$ of genus 1 curves with one marked point. This is the stack of elliptic curves. Level 1 modular forms are sections of line bundles on this stack, and level N modular forms are sections of line bundles on the stack of elliptic curves with level N structure (roughly a marking of the points of order N).

== Boundary geometry ==
An important property of the compactified moduli spaces $\overline{\mathcal{M}}_{g,n}$ is that their boundary can be described in terms of moduli spaces $\overline{\mathcal{M}}_{g',n'}$ for genera $g' < g$. Given a marked, stable, nodal curve one can associate its dual graph, a graph with vertices labelled by nonnegative integers and allowed to have loops, multiple edges and also numbered half-edges. Here the vertices of the graph correspond to irreducible components of the nodal curve, the labelling of a vertex is the arithmetic genus of the corresponding component, edges correspond to nodes of the curve and the half-edges correspond to the markings. The closure of the locus of curves with a given dual graph in $\overline{\mathcal{M}}_{g,n}$ is isomorphic to the stack quotient of a product $\prod_v \overline{\mathcal{M}}_{g_v,n_v}$ of compactified moduli spaces of curves by a finite group. In the product the factor corresponding to a vertex v has genus g_{v} taken from the labelling and number of markings $n_v$ equal to the number of outgoing edges and half-edges at v. The total genus g is the sum of the g_{v} plus the number of closed cycles in the graph.

Stable curves whose dual graph contains a vertex labelled by $g_v=g$ (hence all other vertices have $g_v=0$ and the graph is a tree) are called "rational tail" and their moduli space is denoted $\mathcal{M}^{\mathrm{r.t.}}_{g,n}$. Stable curves whose dual graph is a tree are called "compact type" (because the Jacobian is compact) and their moduli space is denoted $\mathcal{M}^{\mathrm{c.}}_{g,n}$.

== See also ==
- Witten conjecture
- Tautological ring
- Grothendieck–Riemann–Roch theorem
