= Current algebra =

Infinite dimensional Lie algebra occurring in quantum field theory

Certain commutation relations among the current density operators in quantum field theories define an infinite-dimensional Lie algebra called a current algebra. Mathematically these are Lie algebras consisting of smooth maps from a manifold into a finite dimensional Lie algebra.

== History ==
The original current algebra, proposed in 1964 by Murray Gell-Mann, described weak and electromagnetic currents of the strongly interacting particles, hadrons, leading to the Adler–Weisberger formula and other important physical results. The basic concept, in the era just preceding quantum chromodynamics, was that even without knowing the Lagrangian governing hadron dynamics in detail, exact kinematical information – the local symmetry – could still be encoded in an algebra of currents.

The commutators involved in current algebra amount to an infinite-dimensional extension of the Jordan map, where the quantum fields represent infinite arrays of oscillators.

Current algebraic techniques are still part of the shared background of particle physics when analyzing symmetries and indispensable in discussions of the Goldstone theorem.

== Example ==
In a non-Abelian Yang–Mills symmetry, where V and A are flavor-current and axial-current 0th components (charge densities), respectively, the paradigm of a current algebra is

$\bigl[\ V^a(\vec{x}),\ V^b(\vec{y})\ \bigr] = i\ f^{ab}_c\ \delta(\vec{x}-\vec{y})\ V^c(\vec{x})\ ,$ and
$$\bigl[\ V^a(\vec{x}),\ A^b(\vec{y})\ \bigr] = i\ f^{ab}_c\ \delta(\vec{x} - \vec{y})\ A^c(\vec{x})\ ,\qquad
\bigl[\ A^a(\vec{x}),\ A^b(\vec{y})\ \bigr] = i\ f^{ab}_c\ \delta(\vec{x} - \vec{y})\ V^c(\vec{x}) ~,$$

where f are the structure constants of the Lie algebra. To get meaningful expressions, these must be normal ordered.

The algebra resolves to a direct sum of two algebras, L and R, upon defining

$$L^a(\vec{x})\equiv \tfrac{1}{2}\bigl(\ V^a(\vec{x}) - A^a(\vec{x})\ \bigr)\ , \qquad R^a(\vec{x}) \equiv  \tfrac{1}{2}\bigl(\ V^a(\vec{x}) + A^a(\vec{x})\ \bigr)\ ,$$

whereupon $\bigl[\ L^a(\vec{x}),\ L^b(\vec{y})\ \bigr]= i\ f^{ab}_c\ \delta(\vec{x}-\vec{y})\ L^c(\vec{x})\ ,\quad \bigl[\ L^a(\vec{x}),\ R^b(\vec{y})\ \bigr] = 0, \quad \bigl[\ R^a(\vec{x}),\ R^b(\vec{y})\ \bigr] = i\ f^{ab}_c\ \delta(\vec{x}-\vec{y})\ R^c(\vec{x})~.$

== Conformal field theory ==
For the case where space is a one-dimensional circle, current algebras arise naturally as a central extension of the loop algebra, known as Kac–Moody algebras or, more specifically, affine Lie algebras. In this case, the commutator and normal ordering can be given a very precise mathematical definition in terms of integration contours on the complex plane, thus avoiding some of the formal divergence difficulties commonly encountered in quantum field theory.

When the Killing form of the Lie algebra is contracted with the current commutator, one obtains the energy–momentum tensor of a two-dimensional conformal field theory. When this tensor is expanded as a Laurent series, the resulting algebra is called the Virasoro algebra. This calculation is known as the Sugawara construction.

The general case is formalized as the vertex operator algebra.

== See also ==
- Affine Lie algebra
- Chiral model
- Jordan map
- Virasoro algebra
- Vertex operator algebra
- Kac–Moody algebra
