= Critical three-state Potts model =

Two dimensional conformal field theory

The three-state Potts CFT, also known as the $\mathbb{Z}_3$ parafermion CFT, is a conformal field theory in two dimensions. It is a minimal model with central charge $c=4/5$. It is considered to be the simplest minimal model with a non-diagonal partition function in Virasoro characters, as well as the simplest non-trivial CFT with the W-algebra as a symmetry.

== Properties ==
The critical three-state Potts model has a central charge of $c = 4/5$, and thus belongs to the discrete family of unitary minimal models with central charge less than one. These conformal field theories are fully classified and for the most part well-understood.

The modular partition function of the critical three-state Potts model is given by

$$Z = |\chi_{1,1} + \chi_{4,1}|^2 + |\chi_{2,1} + \chi_{3,1}|^2 + 2|\chi_{4,3}|^2+2|\chi_{3,3}|^2$$

Here $\chi_{r,s} (q) \equiv \textrm{Tr}_{(r,s)} (q^{L_0-c/24})$ refers to the Virasoro character, found by taking the trace over the Verma module generated from the Virasoro primary operator labeled by integers $r, s$. The labeling $(r, s)$ is a standard convention for primary operators of the $c<1$ minimal models.

Furthermore, the critical three-state Potts model is symmetric not only under the Virasoro algebra, but also under an enlarged algebra called the W-algebra that includes the Virasoro algebra as well as some spin-3 currents. The local holomorphic W primaries are given by $1, \epsilon, \sigma_1, \sigma_2, \psi_1, \psi_2$. The local antiholomorphic W primaries similarly are given by $1, \bar{\epsilon}, \bar{\sigma}_1, \bar{\sigma}_2, \bar{\psi}_1, \bar{\psi}_2$ with the same scaling dimensions. Each field in the theory is either a combination of a holomorphic and antiholomorphic W-algebra primary field, or a descendant of such a field generated by acting with W-algebra generators. Some primaries of the Virasoro algebra, such as the $(3,1)$ primary, are not primaries of the W algebra.

Chiral W primaries in the critical 3-state Potts model
Primary	Dimension	$\mathbb{Z}_3$ charge	Kac Label
$1$	0	0	(1,1)+(4,1)
$\epsilon$	2/5	0	(2,1)+(3,1)
$\psi_1$	2/3	1	(1,3)
$\psi_2$	2/3	-1	(1,3)
$\sigma_1$	1/15	1	(3,3)
$\sigma_2$	1/15	-1	(3,3)

The partition function is diagonal when expressed in terms of W-algebra characters (where traces are taken over irreducible representations of the W algebra, instead of over irreducible representations of the Virasoro algebra). Since $\chi_1 = \chi_{1,1} + \chi_{4,1}$ and $\chi_{\epsilon} = \chi_{2,1} + \chi_{3,1}$, we can write

$$Z = |\chi_{1}|^2 + |\chi_{\epsilon}|^2 + |\chi_{\psi_1}|^2+|\chi_{\psi_2}|^2+|\chi_{\sigma_1}|^2+|\chi_{\sigma_2}|^2$$

The operators $\sigma_1, \sigma_2, \psi_1, \psi_2$ are charged under the action of a global $\mathbb{Z}_3$ symmetry. That is, under a global global $\mathbb{Z}_3$ transformation, they pick up phases $\sigma_a \to e^{2\pi i a/3} \sigma_a$ and $\psi_a \to e^{2\pi i a/3} \psi_a$ for $a = 1,2$. The fusion rules governing the operator product expansions involving these fields respect the action of this $\mathbb{Z}_3$ transformation. There is also a charge conjugation symmetry that interchanges $\sigma_1 \leftrightarrow \sigma_2, \psi_1 \leftrightarrow \psi_2$. Sometimes the notation $\sigma, \sigma^\dagger, \psi, \psi^\dagger$ is used in the literature instead of $\sigma_1, \sigma_2, \psi_1, \psi_2$.

The critical three-state Potts model is one of the two modularly invariant conformal field theories that exist with central charge $c= 4/5$. The other such theory is the tetracritical Ising model, which has a diagonal partition function in terms of Virasoro characters. It is possible to obtain the critical three-state Potts model from the tetracritical Ising model by applying a $\mathbb{Z}_2$ orbifold transformation to the latter.

== Lattice Hamiltonians ==
The critical three-state Potts conformal field theory can be realised as the low energy effective theory at the phase transition of the one-dimensional quantum three-state Potts model.

The Hamiltonian of the quantum three-state Potts model is given by

$$H = -J(\sum_{ \langle i, j \rangle} (Z^\dagger_i Z_{j}+ Z_i Z^{\dagger}_{j}) + g \sum_j (X_j + X^\dagger_j) )$$

Here $J$ and $g$ are positive parameters. The first term couples degrees of freedom on nearest neighbour sites in the lattice. $X$ and $Z$ are $3 \times 3$ clock matrices satisfying $X^3 = Z^3 = 1$ and same-site commutation relation $ZX = \omega XZ$ where $\omega = -\frac{1}{2} + i \frac{\sqrt{3}}{2}$.

This Hamiltonian is symmetric under any permutation of the three $Z$ eigenstates on each site, as long as the same permutation is done on every site. Thus it is said to have a global $S_3$ symmetry. A $\mathbb{Z}_3$ subgroup of this symmetry is generated by the unitary operator $\prod_j X_j$.

In one dimension, the model has two gapped phases, the ordered phase and the disordered phase. The ordered phase occurs at $0 <g <1$ and is characterised by a nonzero ground state expectation value of the order parameter $Z_j$ at any site $j$. The ground state in this phase explicitly breaks the global $S_3$ symmetry and is thus three-fold degenerate. The disordered phase occurs at $g>1$ and is characterised by a single ground state. In between these two phases is a phase transition at $g= 1$. At this particular value of $g$, the Hamiltonian is gapless with a ground state energy of $E_0 = -(\frac{4}{3}+ \frac{2\sqrt{3}}{\pi})J L$, where $L$ is the length of the chain. In other words, in the limit of an infinitely long chain, the lowest energy eigenvalues of the Hamiltonian are spaced infinitesimally close to each other. As is the case for most one dimensional gapless theories, it is possible to describe the low energy physics of the 3-state Potts model using a 1+1 dimensional conformal field theory; in this particular lattice model that conformal field theory is none other than the critical three-state Potts model.

=== Lattice operator correspondence ===
Under the flow of renormalisation group, lattice operators in the quantum three-state Potts model flow to fields in the conformal field theory. In general, understanding which operators flow to what fields is difficult and not obvious. Analytical and numerical arguments suggest a correspondence between a few lattice operators and CFT fields as follows. Lattice indices $j$ map to the corresponding field positions $z , \bar{z}$ in space-time, and non-universal real number prefactors are ignored.

- $Z_j \sim \Phi_{\sigma_1, \bar{\sigma}_1} (z,\bar z)$, the $\frac{2}{15}$-dimensional field composed of holomorphic and anti-holomorphic parts $\sigma_1(z)$ and $\bar \sigma_1(\bar z)$
- $Z_j^\dagger \sim \Phi_{\sigma_2, \bar{\sigma}_2} (z,\bar z)$
- $Z_j Z_{j+1}^\dagger - \frac{1}{2}(X_j + X_{j+1}) + \textrm{h.c.} \sim \Phi_{\epsilon, \bar{\epsilon}}(z,\bar z)$ . As can be seen in the lattice language, adding this operator to every site of the Hamiltonian has the effect of tuning $g$ away from 1. This operator is called the thermal operator, because in the classical statistical mechanics analog of the quantum lattice model, tuning $g$ would be equivalent to changing temperature away from the critical temperature.
- $-Z_j Z_{j+1}^\dagger - \frac{1}{2}(X_j + X_{j+1}) + \textrm{h.c.} + \frac{4}{3}+ \frac{2\sqrt{3}}{\pi} \sim T(z) + \bar T(\bar z)$, the dimension-2 stress-energy tensor field.
- $Z_j(2-3\omega^2 X_j - 3\omega X_j^2) -2Z_j^\dagger (Z_{j-1}^\dagger +Z_{j+1}^\dagger) \sim \psi_1(z) \bar \psi_1(\bar z)$
