= Richard Earl Block =

American mathematician

Richard Earl Block (born 1931) is an American mathematician. He was a distinguished professor at the University of California, Riverside who works on Lie algebras over fields of prime characteristic.

Block earned his Ph.D. from the University of Chicago in 1956 under the supervision of Abraham Adrian Albert. He was the first to discover the central extension of the Witt algebra that gives the Virasoro algebra, though his discovery went unnoticed for many years. With Robert Lee Wilson he classified the simple Lie algebras over "well behaved" fields of finite characteristic.

In 2012 he became a fellow of the American Mathematical Society.

== Selected publications ==
- Richard E. Block, On the Mills–Seligman axioms for Lie algebras of classical type, Transactions of the American Mathematical Society, 121 (1966), pp. 378–392. (The paper that gives the central extension defining the Virasoro algebra.)
- Richard E. Block and Robert Lee Wilson, The Restricted Simple Lie Algebras are of Classical or Cartan Type, Proceedings of the National Academy of Sciences of the United States of America August 15, 1984 vol. 81, no. 16, 5271–5274.
