= W-algebra =

Associative algebra generalizing the Virasoro algebra

In conformal field theory and representation theory, a W-algebra is an associative algebra that generalizes the Virasoro algebra. W-algebras were introduced by Alexander Zamolodchikov, and the name "W-algebra" comes from the fact that Zamolodchikov used the letter W for one of the elements of one of his examples.

== Definition ==
A W-algebra is an associative algebra that is generated by the modes of a finite number of meromorphic fields $W^{(h)}(z)$, including the energy-momentum tensor $T(z)=W^{(2)}(z)$. For $h\neq 2$, $W^{(h)}(z)$ is a primary field of conformal dimension $h\in\frac12\mathbb{N}^*$. The generators $(W^{(h)}_n)_{n\in\mathbb{Z}}$ of the algebra are related to the meromorphic fields by the mode expansions

$$W^{(h)}(z) = \sum_{n\in\mathbb{Z}} W^{(h)}_n z^{-n-h}$$

The commutation relations of $L_n=W^{(2)}_n$ are given by the Virasoro algebra, which is parameterized by a central charge $c\in \mathbb{C}$. This number is also called the central charge of the W-algebra. The commutation relations

$$[L_m, W^{(h)}_n] = ((h-1)m-n)W^{(h)}_{m+n}$$

are equivalent to the assumption that $W^{(h)}(z)$ is a primary field of dimension $h$. The rest of the commutation relations can in principle be determined by solving the Jacobi identities.

Given a finite set of conformal dimensions $H$ (not necessarily all distinct), the number of W-algebras generated by $(W^{(h)})_{h\in H}$ may be zero, one or more. The resulting W-algebras may exist for all $c\in \mathbb{C}$, or only for some specific values of the central charge.

A W-algebra is called freely generated if its generators obey no other relations than the commutation relations. Most commonly studied W-algebras are freely generated, including the W(N) algebras. In this article, the sections on representation theory and correlation functions apply to freely generated W-algebras.

== Constructions ==
While it is possible to construct W-algebras by assuming the existence of a number of meromorphic fields $W^{(h)}(z)$ and solving the Jacobi identities, there also exist systematic constructions of families of W-algebras.

=== Drinfeld-Sokolov reduction ===
From a finite-dimensional Lie algebra $\mathfrak{g}$, together with an embedding $\mathfrak{sl}_2\hookrightarrow\mathfrak{g}$, a W-algebra may be constructed from the universal enveloping algebra of the affine Lie algebra $\hat{\mathfrak{g}}$ by a kind of BRST construction. Then the central charge of the W-algebra is a function of the level of the affine Lie algebra.

=== Coset construction ===
Given a finite-dimensional Lie algebra $\mathfrak{g}$, together with a subalgebra $\mathfrak{h}\hookrightarrow\mathfrak{g}$, a W-algebra $W(\hat\mathfrak{g}/\hat\mathfrak{h})$ may be constructed from the corresponding affine Lie algebras $\hat\mathfrak{h}\hookrightarrow\hat\mathfrak{g}$. The fields that generate $W(\hat\mathfrak{g}/\hat\mathfrak{h})$ are the polynomials in the currents of $\hat\mathfrak{g}$ and their derivatives that commute with the currents of $\hat\mathfrak{h}$. The central charge of $W(\hat\mathfrak{g}/\hat\mathfrak{h})$ is the difference of the central charges of $\hat\mathfrak{g}$ and $\hat\mathfrak{h}$, which are themselves given in terms of their level by the Sugawara construction.

=== Commutator of a set of screenings ===
Given a holomorphic field $\phi(z)$ with values in $\mathbb{R}^n$, and a set of $n$ vectors $a_1,\dots, a_n \in \mathbb{R}^n$, a W-algebra may be defined as the set of polynomials of $\phi$ and its derivatives that commute with the screening charges $\oint e^{(a_i,\phi(z))}dz$. If the vectors $a_i$ are the simple roots of a Lie algebra $\mathfrak{g}$, the resulting W-algebra coincides with an algebra that is obtained from $\mathfrak{g}$ by Drinfeld-Sokolov reduction.

== The W(N) algebras ==
For any integer $N\geq 2$, the W(N) algebra is a W-algebra which is generated by $N-1$ meromorphic fields of dimensions $2,3,\dots, N$. The W(2) algebra coincides with the Virasoro algebra.

=== Construction ===
The W(N) algebra is obtained by Drinfeld-Sokolov reduction of the affine Lie algebra $\widehat{\mathfrak{sl}}_N$.

The embeddings $\mathfrak{sl}_2\hookrightarrow \mathfrak{sl}_N$ are parametrized by the integer partitions of $N$, interpreted as decompositions of the fundamental representation $F$ of $\mathfrak{sl}_N$ into representations of $\mathfrak{sl}_2$. The set $H$ of dimensions of the generators of the resulting W-algebra is such that $F\otimes F = R_1 \oplus \bigoplus_{h\in H} R_{2h-1}$ where $R_d$ is the $d$-dimensional irreducible representation of $\mathfrak{sl}_2$.

The trivial partition $N=N$ corresponds to the W(N) algebra, while $N=1+1+\dots + 1$ corresponds to $\widehat{\mathfrak{sl}}_N$ itself. In the case $N=3$, the partition $3=2+1$ leads to the Bershadsky-Polyakov algebra, whose generating fields have the dimensions $2,\frac32,\frac32,1$.

=== Properties ===
The central charge of the W(N) algebra is given in terms of the level $k$ of the affine Lie algebra by

$$c_{W(N)} = (N-1)\left(1-N(N+1)\left(\frac{1}{k+N}+k+N-2\right)\right)$$

in notations where the central charge of the affine Lie algebra is

$$c_{\widehat{\mathfrak{sl}}_N} = (N-1)(N+1) - \frac{N(N-1)(N+1)}{k+N}$$

It is possible to choose a basis such that the commutation relations are invariant under $W^{(h)} \to (-1)^h W^{(h)}$.

While the Virasoro algebra is a subalgebra of the universal enveloping algebra of $\widehat{\mathfrak{sl}}_2$, the W(N) algebra with $N\geq 3$ is not a subalgebra of the universal enveloping algebra of $\widehat{\mathfrak{sl}}_N$.

=== Example of the W(3) algebra ===
The W(3) algebra is generated by the generators of the Virasoro algebra $(L_n)_{n\in\mathbb{Z}}$, plus another infinite family of generators $(W_n)_{n\in\mathbb{Z}}=(W^{(3)}_n)_{n\in\mathbb{Z}}$. The commutation relations are

$$[L_m,L_n] =  (m-n)L_{m+n} +\frac{c}{12}m(m^2-1)\delta_{m+n,0}$$
$$[L_m, W_n] = (2m-n)W_{m+n}$$
$$[W_m, W_n] = \frac{c}{360} m(m^2-1)(m^2-4) \delta_{m+n,0} +\frac{16(m-n)}{22+5c}\Lambda_{m+n}
+ \frac{(m-n)(2m^2-mn+2n^2-8)}{30} L_{m+n}$$

where $c\in\mathbb{C}$ is the central charge, and we define

$$\Lambda_n = \sum_{m=-\infty}^{-2}L_mL_{n-m} +\sum_{m=-1}^\infty L_{n-m}L_m -\frac{3}{10}(n+2)(n+3)L_n$$

The field $\Lambda(z) = \sum_{n\in\mathbb{Z}}\Lambda_n z^{-n-4}$ is such that $\Lambda = (TT) - \frac{3}{10} T''$.

== Representation theory ==
=== Highest weight representations ===
A highest weight representation of a W-algebra is a representation that is generated by a primary state: a vector $v$ such that

$$W^{(h)}_{n>0}v=0 \quad , \quad W^{(h)}_0v = q^{(h)} v$$

for some numbers $q^{(h)}$ called the charges, including the conformal dimension $q^{(2)}=\Delta$.

Given a set $\vec{q}=(q^{(h)})_{h\in H}$ of charges, the corresponding Verma module is the largest highest-weight representation that is generated by a primary state with these charges. A basis of the Verma module is

$$\left\{ \prod_{h\in H} W^{(h)}_{-\vec{N}_h} v \right\}_{\vec{N}_h\in \mathcal{V}}$$

where $\mathcal{V}$ is the set of ordered tuples of strictly positive integers of the type $\vec{N} = (n_1,n_2,\dots,n_p)$ with $0<n_1\leq n_2\leq \dots \leq n_p$, and $W_{-\vec{N}} = W_{-n_1}W_{-n_2}\dots W_{-n_p}$. Except for $v$ itself, the elements of this basis are called descendant states, and their linear combinations are also called descendant states.

For generic values of the charges, the Verma module is the only highest weight representation. For special values of the charges that depend on the algebra's central charge, there exist other highest weight representations, called degenerate representations. Degenerate representations exist if the Verma module is reducible, and they are quotients of the Verma module by its nontrivial submodules.

=== Degenerate representations ===
If a Verma module is reducible, any indecomposible submodule is itself a highest weight representation, and is generated by a state that is both descendant and primary, called a null state or null vector. A degenerate representation is obtained by setting one or more null vectors to zero. Setting all the null vectors to zero leads to an irreducible representation.

The structures and characters of irreducible representations can be deduced by Drinfeld-Sokolov reduction from representations of affine Lie algebras.

The existence of null vectors is possible only under $c$-dependent constraints on the charge $\vec{q}$. A Verma module can have only finitely many null vectors that are not descendants of other null vectors. If we start from a Verma module that has a maximal number of null vectors, and set all these null vectors to zero, we obtain an irreducible representation called a fully degenerate representation.

For example, in the case of the algebra W(3), the Verma module with vanishing charges $q^{(2)}=q^{(3)}=0$ has the three null vectors $L_{-1}v, W_{-1}v, W_{-2}v$ at levels 1, 1 and 2. Setting these null vectors to zero yields a fully degenerate representation called the vacuum module. The simplest nontrivial fully degenerate representation of W(3) has vanishing null vectors at levels 1, 2 and 3, whose expressions are explicitly known.

An alternative characterization of a fully degenerate representation is that its fusion product with any Verma module is a sum of finitely many indecomposable representations.

=== Case of W(N) ===
It is convenient to parametrize highest-weight representations not by the set of charges $\vec{q}=(q^{(2)},\dots, q^{(N)})$, but by an element $P$ of the weight space of $\mathfrak{sl}_N$, called the momentum.

Let $e_1,\dots, e_{N-1}$ be the simple roots of $\mathfrak{sl}_N$, with a scalar product $K_{ij}=(e_i,e_j)$ given by the Cartan matrix of $\mathfrak{sl}_N$, whose nonzero elements are $K_{ii}=2, K_{i,i+1}=K_{i,i-1}=-1$. The $\frac12 N(N-1)$ positive simple roots are sums of any number of consecutive simple roots, and the Weyl vector is their half-sum $\rho =\frac12 \sum_{e>0} e$, which obeys $(\rho,\rho)=\frac{1}{12} N(N^2-1)$. The fundamental weights $\omega_1,\dots, \omega_{N-1}$ are defined by $(\omega_i,e_j)=\delta_{ij}$. Then the momentum is a vector

$$P = \sum_{i=1}^{N-1} P_i\omega_i \quad i.e. \quad (e_i,P)=P_i$$

The charges $q^{(h)}$ are functions of the momentum and the central charge, invariant under the action of the Weyl group. In particular, $q^{(h)}$ is a polynomial of the momentum of degree $h$, which under the Dynkin diagram automorphism $e_i^* = e_{N-i}$ behaves as $q^{(h)}(P^*) = (-1)^h q^{(h)}(P)$. The conformal dimension is

$$q^{(2)} = \frac{c+1-N}{24} - (P, P)$$

Let us parametrize the central charge in terms of a number $b$ such that

$$c= (N-1)\big(1+N(N+1)\left(b+b^{-1}\right)^2\big)$$

If there is a positive root $e>0$ and two integers $r,s\in\mathbb{N}^*$ such that

$$(e, P)=rb+sb^{-1}$$

then the Verma module of momentum $P$ has a null vector at level $rs$. This null vector is itself a primary state of momentum $P-rbe$ or equivalently (by a Weyl reflection) $P-sb^{-1}e$. The number of independent null vectors is the number of positive roots such that $(e,P)\in \mathbb{N}^* b+\mathbb{N}^*b^{-1}$ (up to a Weyl reflection).

The maximal number of null vectors is the number of positive roots $\frac12N(N-1)$. The corresponding momentums are of the type

$$P =(b+b^{-1})\rho +b\Omega^+ +b^{-1} \Omega^-$$

where $\Omega^+,\Omega^-$ are integral dominant weights, i.e. elements of $\sum_{i=1}^{N-1}\mathbb{N}\omega_i$, which are highest weights of irreducible finite-dimensional representations of $\mathfrak{sl}_N$. Let us call $\mathcal{R}_{\Omega_+,\Omega_-}$ the corresponding fully degenerate representation of the W(N) algebra.

The irreducible finite-dimensional representation $R_\Omega$ of $\mathfrak{sl}_N$ of highest weight $\Omega$ has a finite set of weights $\Lambda_\Omega$, with $|\Lambda_\Omega| = \dim(R_\Omega)$. Its tensor product with a Verma module $V_p$ of weight $p\in \sum_{i=1}^{N-1} \mathbb{R}\omega_i$ is $R_\Omega \otimes V_p = \bigoplus_{\lambda\in \Lambda_\Omega} V_{p+\lambda}$. The fusion product of the fully degenerate representation $\mathcal{R}_{\Omega_+,\Omega_-}$ of W(N) with a Verma module $\mathcal{V}_P$ of momentum $P$ is then

$$\mathcal{R}_{\Omega_+,\Omega_-}\times \mathcal{V}_P = \sum_{\lambda_+\in \Lambda_{\Omega_+}}\sum_{\lambda_-\in \Lambda_{\Omega_-}} \mathcal{V}_{P+b\lambda_++b^{-1}\lambda_-}$$

== Correlation functions ==
=== Primary fields ===
To a primary state of charge $\vec{q}=(q^{(h)})_{h\in H}$, the state-field correspondence associates a primary field $V_{\vec{q}}(z)$, whose operator product expansions with the fields $W^{(h)}(z)$ are

$$W^{(h)}(y)V_{\vec{q}}(z) = \left(\frac{q^{(h)}}{(y-z)^h} + \sum_{n=1}^{h-1} \frac{W^{(h)}_{-n}}{(y-z)^{h-n}}\right) V_{\vec{q}}(z) + O(1)$$

On any field $V(z)$, the mode $L_{-1}$ of the energy-momentum tensor acts as a derivative, $L_{-1}V(z) = \frac{\partial}{\partial z} V(z)$.

=== Ward identities ===
On the Riemann sphere, if there is no field at infinity, we have $W^{(h)}(y)\underset{y\to \infty}{=} O\left(y^{-2h}\right)$. For $n=0,1,\dots, 2h-2$, the identity $\oint_\infty dy\ y^nW^{(h)}(y)=0$ may be inserted in any correlation function. Therefore, the field $W^{(h)}(y)$ gives rise to $2h-1$ global Ward identities.

Local Ward identities are obtained by inserting $\oint_\infty dy\ \varphi(y)W^{(h)}(y)=0$, where $\varphi(y)$ is a meromorphic function such that $\varphi(y)\underset{y\to \infty}{=} O\left(y^{2h-2}\right)$. In a correlation function of primary fields, local Ward identities determine the action of $W^{(h)}_{-n}$ with $n\geq h$ in terms of the action of $W^{(h)}_{-n}$ with $n\leq h-1$.

For example, in the case of a three-point function on the sphere $\left\langle\prod_{i=1}^3 V_{\vec{q}_i}(z_i)\right\rangle$ of W(3)-primary fields, local Ward identities determine all the descendant three-point functions as linear combinations of descendant three-point functions that involve only $L_{-1},W_{-1},W_{-2}$. Global Ward identities further reduce the problem to determining three-point functions of the type $\left\langle V_{\vec{q}_1}(z_1)V_{\vec{q}_2}(z_2)W_{-1}^k V_{\vec{q}_3}(z_3)\right\rangle$ for $k\in \mathbb{N}$.

In the W(3) algebra, as in generic W-algebras, correlation functions of descendant fields can therefore not be deduced from correlation functions of primary fields using Ward identities, as was the case for the Virasoro algebra. A W(3)-Verma module appears in the fusion product of two other W(3)-Verma modules with a multiplicity that is in general infinite.

=== Differential equations ===
A correlation function may obey a differential equation that generalizes the BPZ equations if the fields have sufficiently many vanishing null vectors.

A four-point function of W(N)-primary fields on the sphere with one fully degenerate field obeys a differential equation if $N=2$ but not if $N\geq 3$. In the latter case, for a differential equation to exist, one of the other fields must have vanishing null vectors. For example, a four-point function with two fields of momentums $P_1 = (b+b^{-1})\rho + b\omega_1$ (fully degenerate) and $P_2 = (b+b^{-1})\rho + x\omega_{N-1}$ with $x\in \mathbb{C}$ (almost fully degenerate) obeys a differential equation whose solutions are generalized hypergeometric functions of type ${}_NF_{N-1}$.

== Applications to conformal field theory ==
=== W-minimal models ===
W-minimal models are generalizations of Virasoro minimal models based on a W-algebra. Their spaces of states are made of finitely many fully degenerate representations. They exist for certain rational values of the central charge: in the case of the W(N) algebra, values of the type

$$c^{(N)}_{p, q} = N-1 - N(N^2-1)\frac{(p-q)^2}{pq}  \quad \text{with} \quad p,q\in\mathbb{N}^*$$

A W(N)-minimal model with central charge $c_{k+N,k+N+1}$ may be constructed as a coset of Wess-Zumino-Witten models $\frac{SU(N)_k\times SU(N)_1}{SU(N)_{k+1}}$.

For example, the two-dimensional critical three-state Potts model has central charge $c^{(2)}_{5,6}=c^{(3)}_{4,5}=\frac45$. Spin observables of the model may be described in terms of the D-series non-diagonal Virasoro minimal model with $(p,q) = (5,6)$, or in terms of the diagonal W(3)-minimal model with $(p,q)=(4,5)$.

=== Conformal Toda theory ===
Conformal Toda theory is a generalization of Liouville theory that is based on a W-algebra. Given a simple Lie algebra $\mathfrak{g}$, the Lagrangian is a functional of a field $\phi$ which belongs to the root space of $\mathfrak{g}$, with one interaction term for each simple root:

$$L[\phi] = \frac{1}{2\pi} (\partial \phi,\bar\partial\phi) + \mu \sum_{e\in \{\text{simple roots of } \mathfrak{g}\}} \exp\left(b(e,\phi)\right)$$

This depends on the cosmological constant $\mu$, which plays no meaningful role, and on the parameter $b$, which is related to the central charge. The resulting field theory is a conformal field theory, whose chiral symmetry algebra is a W-algebra constructed from $\mathfrak{g}$ by Drinfeld-Sokolov reduction. For the preservation of conformal symmetry in the quantum theory, it is crucial that there are no more interaction terms than components of the vector $\phi$.

The methods that lead to the solution of Liouville theory may be applied to W(N)-conformal Toda theory, but they only lead to the analytic determination of a particular class of three-point structure constants, and W(N)-conformal Toda theory with $N\geq 3$ has not been solved.

=== Logarithmic conformal field theory ===
At central charge $c=c^{(2)}_{1,q}$, the Virasoro algebra can be extended by a triplet of generators of dimension $2q-1$, thus forming a W-algebra with the set of dimensions $H=\{2,2q-1,2q-1,2q-1\}$. Then it is possible to build a rational conformal field theory based on this W-algebra, which is logarithmic. The simplest case is obtained for $q=2$, has central charge $c=-2$, and has been particularly well studied, including in the presence of a boundary.

== Related concepts ==
=== Classical W-algebras ===
Classical W-algebra is a kind of Poisson algebra which characterized by some nilpotent element of Lie (super)algebra.

=== Finite W-algebras ===
Finite W-algebras are certain associative algebras associated to nilpotent elements of semisimple Lie algebras.

The original definition, provided by Alexander Premet, starts with a pair $(\mathfrak{g}, e)$ consisting of a reductive Lie algebra $\mathfrak{g}$ over the complex numbers and a nilpotent element e. By the Jacobson-Morozov theorem, e is part of a sl_{2} triple (e, h, f). The eigenspace decomposition of ad(h) induces a $\mathbb{Z}$-grading on $\mathfrak{g}$:

$$\mathfrak{g} = \bigoplus \mathfrak{g} (i).$$

Define a character $\chi$ (i.e. a homomorphism from $\mathfrak{g}$ to the trivial 1-dimensional Lie algebra) by the rule $\chi(x) = \kappa(e,x)$, where $\kappa$ denotes the Killing form. This induces a non-degenerate anti-symmetric bilinear form on the −1 graded piece by the rule:

$$\omega_\chi (x,y) = \chi ( [x,y] ).$$

After choosing any Lagrangian subspace $l$, we may define the following nilpotent subalgebra which acts on the universal enveloping algebra by the adjoint action.

$$\mathfrak{m} = l + \bigoplus_{i \leq -2} \mathfrak{g} (i).$$

The left ideal $I$ of the universal enveloping algebra $U(\mathfrak{g})$ generated by $\{ x - \chi(x) : x \in \mathfrak{m} \}$ is invariant under this action. It follows from a short calculation that the invariants in $U(\mathfrak{g})/I$ under ad$(\mathfrak{m})$ inherit the associative algebra structure from $U(\mathfrak{g})$. The invariant subspace $(U(\mathfrak{g})/I)^{\text{ad}(\mathfrak{m})}$ is called the finite W-algebra constructed from $(\mathfrak{g}, e)$, and is usually denoted $U(\mathfrak{g},e)$.
