= Virasoro algebra =

Algebra describing 2D conformal symmetry

In mathematics, the Virasoro algebra is a complex Lie algebra and the unique nontrivial central extension of the Witt algebra. It is widely used in two-dimensional conformal field theory and in string theory. It is named after Miguel Ángel Virasoro.

== Structure ==
The Virasoro algebra is spanned by generators L_{n} for $n \isin \mathbb{Z}$ and the central charge c. These generators satisfy $[c,L_n]=0$ and

$[L_m, L_n] = (m - n) L_{m+n} + \frac{c}{12} (m^3 - m) \delta_{m+n,0}.$

The factor of $\frac{1}{12}$ is merely a matter of convention. For a derivation of the algebra as the unique central extension of the Witt algebra, see derivation of the Virasoro algebra or Schottenloher, Thm. 5.1, pp. 79.

The Virasoro algebra has a presentation in terms of two generators (e.g. L_{3} and L_{−2}) and six relations.

The generators $L_{n>0}$ are called annihilation modes, while $L_{n<0}$ are creation modes. A basis of creation generators of the Virasoro algebra's universal enveloping algebra is the set

$$\mathcal{L} = \Big\{ L_{-n_1} L_{-n_2} \cdots L_{-n_k}\Big\}_{\begin{array}{l} k\in\mathbb{N} \\ 0 < n_1 \leq n_2 \leq \cdots n_k\end{array}}$$

For $L\in \mathcal{L}$, let $|L|= \sum_{i=1}^k n_i$, then $[L_0,L] = |L|L$.

== Representation theory ==
In any indecomposable representation of the Virasoro algebra, the central generator $c$ of the algebra takes a constant value, also denoted $c$ and called the representation's central charge.

A vector $v$ in a representation of the Virasoro algebra has conformal dimension (or conformal weight) $h$ if it is an eigenvector of $L_0$ with eigenvalue $h$:

$$L_0 v = hv$$

An $L_0$-eigenvector $v$ is called a primary state (of dimension $h$) if it is annihilated by the annihilation modes,

$$L_{n>0} v = 0$$

=== Highest weight representations ===
A highest weight representation of the Virasoro algebra is a representation generated by a primary state $v$. A highest weight representation is spanned by the $L_0$-eigenstates $\{Lv\}_{L\in\mathcal{L}}$. The conformal dimension of $Lv$ is $h+|L|$, where $|L|\in\mathbb{N}$ is called the level of $Lv$. Any state whose level is not zero is called a descendant state of $v$.

For any $h,c\in\mathbb{C}$, the Verma module $\mathcal V_{c,h}$ of central charge $c$ and conformal dimension $h$ is the representation whose basis is $\{Lv\}_{L\in\mathcal{L}}$, for $v$ a primary state of dimension $h$. The Verma module is the largest possible highest weight representation. The Verma module is indecomposable, and for generic values of $h,c\in\mathbb{C}$ it is also irreducible. When it is reducible, there exist other highest weight representations with these values of $h,c\in\mathbb{C}$, called degenerate representations, which are quotients of the Verma module. In particular, the unique irreducible highest weight representation with these values of $h,c\in\mathbb{C}$ is the quotient of the Verma module by its maximal submodule.

A Verma module is irreducible if and only if it has no singular vectors.

=== Singular vectors ===
A singular vector or null vector of a highest weight representation is a state that is both descendant and primary.

A sufficient condition for the Verma module $\mathcal V_{c,h}$ to have a singular vector is $h=h_{r,s}(c)$ for some $r,s\in\mathbb{N}^*$, where

$$h_{r,s}(c) = \frac14\Big( (\beta r - \beta^{-1}s)^2-(\beta-\beta^{-1})^2\Big)\ ,\quad \text{where} \quad c=1-6(\beta-\beta^{-1})^2\ .$$

Then the singular vector has level $rs$ and conformal dimension

$$h_{r,s}+rs = h_{r,-s}$$

Here are the values of $h_{r,s}(c)$ for $rs\leq 4$, together with the corresponding singular vectors, written as $L_{r,s}v$ for $v$ the primary state of $\mathcal{V}_{c,h_{r,s}(c)}$:

$$\begin{array}{|c|c|l|}
\hline
r,s & h_{r,s} & L_{r,s}
\\
\hline
\hline
1,1 & 0  & L_{-1}
\\
\hline
2,1 & -\frac12 +\frac{3}{4} \beta^2  & L_{-1}^2 -\beta^2 L_{-2}
\\
\hline
1,2 & -\frac12 + \frac{3}{4}\beta^{-2}  & L_{-1}^2 -\beta^{-2} L_{-2}
\\
\hline
3,1 &  -1 +2 \beta^2  &L_{-1}^3 -4\beta^2 L_{-1}L_{-2}+2\beta^2(2\beta^2+1)L_{-3}
\\
\hline
1,3  &  -1 +2 \beta^{-2}  &L_{-1}^3 -4\beta^{-2} L_{-1}L_{-2}+2\beta^{-2}(2\beta^{-2}+1)L_{-3}
\\
\hline
4,1  &  -\frac32 +\frac{15}{4} \beta^2  &
\begin{array}{r}
L_{-1}^4 -10\beta^2L_{-1}^2L_{-2}
+2\beta^2\left(12\beta^2+5\right) L_{-1}L_{-3}
\\
+9\beta^4 L_{-2}^2
-6\beta^2\left(6\beta^4+4\beta^2+1\right)L_{-4}
\end{array}
\\
\hline
2,2 & \frac34\left(\beta-\beta^{-1}\right)^2 &
\begin{array}{l}
L_{-1}^4-2\left(\beta^2+\beta^{-2}\right)L_{-1}^2L_{-2}
+\left(\beta^2-\beta^{-2}\right)^2 L_{-2}^2
\\
+2\left(1+\left(\beta+\beta^{-1}\right)^2\right) L_{-1}L_{-3}
-2\left(\beta+\beta^{-1}\right)^2 L_{-4}
\end{array}
\\
\hline
1,4 &  -\frac32 +\frac{15}{4} \beta^{-2} &
\begin{array}{r}
L_{-1}^4 -10\beta^{-2}L_{-1}^2L_{-2}
+2\beta^{-2}\left(12\beta^{-2}+5\right) L_{-1}L_{-3}
\\
+9\beta^{-4} L_{-2}^2
-6\beta^{-2}\left(6\beta^{-4}+4\beta^{-2}+1\right)L_{-4}
\end{array}
\\
\hline
\end{array}$$

Singular vectors for arbitrary $r,s\in\mathbb{N}^*$ may be computed using various algorithms, and their explicit expressions are known.

If $\beta^2\notin\mathbb{Q}$, then $\mathcal V_{c,h}$ has a singular vector at level $N$ if and only if $h=h_{r,s}(c)$ with $N=rs$. If $\beta^2\in\mathbb{Q}$, there can also exist a singular vector at level $N$ if $N= rs + r's'$ with $h=h_{r,s}(c)$ and $h+rs = h_{r',s'}(c)$. This singular vector is now a descendant of another singular vector at level $rs$.

The integers $r,s$ that appear in $h_{r,s}(c)$ are called Kac indices. It can be useful to use non-integer Kac indices for parametrizing the conformal dimensions of Verma modules that do not have singular vectors, for example in the critical random cluster model.

=== Shapovalov form ===
For any $c,h\in\mathbb{C}$, the involution $L_n\mapsto L^*=L_{-n}$ defines an automorphism of the Virasoro algebra and of its universal enveloping algebra. Then the Shapovalov form is the symmetric bilinear form on the Verma module $\mathcal{V}_{c,h}$ such that $(Lv,L'v)= S_{L,L'}(c,h)$, where the numbers $S_{L,L'}(c,h)$ are defined by $L^*L'v \underset{|L|=|L'|}{=} S_{L,L'}(c,h)v$ and $S_{L,L'}(c,h)\underset{|L|\neq |L'|}{=}0$. The inverse Shapovalov form is relevant to computing Virasoro conformal blocks, and can be determined in terms of singular vectors.

The determinant of the Shapovalov form at a given level $N$ is given by the Kac determinant formula,

$$\det \left(S_{L,L'}(c,h)\right)_{\begin{array}{l} L,L'\in\mathcal{L} \\ |L|=|L'|=N\end{array}}  = A_N \prod_{1\le r,s\le N} \big(h - h_{r,s}(c)\big)^{p(N-rs)},$$

where $p(N)$ is the partition function, and $A_N$ is a positive constant that does not depend on $h$ or $c$.

=== Hermitian form and unitarity ===
If $c,h\in\mathbb{R}$, a highest weight representation with conformal dimension $h$ has a unique Hermitian form such that the Hermitian adjoint of $L_n$ is $L_n^\dagger = L_{-n}$ and the norm of the primary state $v$ is one. In the basis $(Lv)_{L\in\mathcal{L}}$, the Hermitian form on the Verma module $\mathcal V_{c,h}$ has the same matrix as the Shapovalov form $S_{L,L'}(c,h)$, now interpreted as a Gram matrix.

The representation is called unitary if that Hermitian form is positive definite. Since any singular vector has zero norm, all unitary highest weight representations are irreducible. An irreducible highest weight representation is unitary if and only if

- either $c\geq 1$ with $h\geq 0$,
- or $c \in \left\{1 - \frac{6}{m(m + 1)}\right\}_{m=2,3,4,\ldots}=\left\{ 0, \frac12, \frac{7}{10}, \frac45, \frac67, \frac{25}{28}, \ldots\right\}$ with $h\in \left\{h_{r,s}(c)=\frac{\big((m + 1) r - ms\big)^2 - 1}{4m(m + 1)}\right\}_{\begin{array}{l} r=1,2,...,m-1 \\ s=1,2,...,m\end{array}}$

Daniel Friedan, Zongan Qiu, and Stephen Shenker showed that these conditions are necessary, and Peter Goddard, Adrian Kent, and David Olive used the coset construction or GKO construction (identifying unitary representations of the Virasoro algebra within tensor products of unitary representations of affine Kac–Moody algebras) to show that they are sufficient.

=== Characters ===
The character of a representation $\mathcal{R}$ of the Virasoro algebra is the function

$$\chi_\mathcal{R}(q) = \operatorname{Tr}_{\mathcal{R}} q^{L_0-\frac{c}{24}}.$$

The character of the Verma module $\mathcal{V}_{c,h}$ is

$$\chi_{\mathcal{V}_{c,h}}(q) = \frac{q^{h-\frac{c}{24}}}{\prod_{n=1}^\infty (1-q^n)} = \frac{q^{h-\frac{c-1}{24}}}{\eta(q)}=q^{h-\frac{c}{24}}\left(1+q+2q^2+3q^3+5q^4+\cdots\right),$$

where $\eta$ is the Dedekind eta function.

For any $c\in\mathbb{C}$ and for $r,s\in \mathbb{N}^*$, the Verma module $\mathcal{V}_{c,h_{r,s}}$ is reducible due to the existence of a singular vector at level $rs$. This singular vector generates a submodule, which is isomorphic to the Verma module $\mathcal{V}_{c,h_{r,s}+rs}$. The quotient of $\mathcal{V}_{c,h_{r,s}}$ by this submodule is irreducible if $\mathcal{V}_{c,h_{r,s}}$ does not have other singular vectors, and its character is

$$\chi_{\mathcal{V}_{c,h_{r,s}}/\mathcal{V}_{c,h_{r,s}+rs}}
= \chi_{\mathcal{V}_{c,h_{r,s}}} -\chi_{\mathcal{V}_{c,h_{r,s}+rs}} = (1-q^{rs})  \chi_{\mathcal{V}_{c,h_{r,s}}}.$$

Let $c=c_{p,p'}$ with $2\leq p<p'$ and $p,p'$ coprime, and $1\leq r \leq p-1$ and $1\leq s\leq p'-1$. (Then $(r,s)$ is in the Kac table of the corresponding minimal model). The Verma module $\mathcal{V}_{c,h_{r,s}}$ has infinitely many singular vectors, and is therefore reducible with infinitely many submodules. This Verma module has an irreducible quotient by its largest nontrivial submodule. (The spectrums of minimal models are built from such irreducible representations.) The character of the irreducible quotient is

$$\begin{align} &\chi_{\mathcal{V}_{c,h_{r,s}}/(\mathcal{V}_{c,h_{r,s}+rs}+\mathcal{V}_{c,h_{r,s}+(p-r)(p'-s)}) }
\\
&= \sum_{k\in\mathbb{Z}} \left(\chi_{\mathcal{V}_{c,\frac{1}{4pp'}\left((p'r-ps+2kpp')^2-(p-p')^2\right)}}-\chi_{\mathcal{V}_{c,\frac{1}{4pp'}\left((p'r+ps+2kpp')^2-(p-p')^2\right)}}\right).
\end{align}$$

This expression is an infinite sum because the submodules $\mathcal{V}_{c,h_{r,s}+rs}$ and $\mathcal{V}_{c,h_{r,s}+(p-r)(p'-s)}$ have a nontrivial intersection, which is itself a complicated submodule.

== Applications ==
=== Conformal field theory ===
In two dimensions, the algebra of local conformal transformations is made of two copies of the Witt algebra. It follows that the symmetry algebra of two-dimensional conformal field theory is the Virasoro algebra. Technically, the conformal bootstrap approach to two-dimensional CFT relies on Virasoro conformal blocks, special functions that include and generalize the characters of representations of the Virasoro algebra.

=== String theory ===
Since the Virasoro algebra comprises the generators of the conformal group of the worldsheet, the stress tensor in string theory obeys the commutation relations of (two copies of) the Virasoro algebra. This is because the conformal group decomposes into separate diffeomorphisms of the forward and back lightcones. Diffeomorphism invariance of the worldsheet implies additionally that the stress tensor vanishes. This is known as the Virasoro constraint, and in the quantum theory, cannot be applied to all the states in the theory, but rather only on the physical states (compare Gupta–Bleuler formalism).

== Generalizations ==
=== Super Virasoro algebras ===
There are two supersymmetric N = 1 extensions of the Virasoro algebra, called the Neveu–Schwarz algebra and the Ramond algebra. Their theory is similar to that of the Virasoro algebra, now involving Grassmann numbers. There are further extensions of these algebras with more supersymmetry, such as the N = 2 superconformal algebra.

=== W-algebras ===
W-algebras are associative algebras which contain the Virasoro algebra, and which play an important role in two-dimensional conformal field theory. Among W-algebras, the Virasoro algebra has the particularity of being a Lie algebra.

=== Affine Lie algebras ===
The Virasoro algebra is a subalgebra of the universal enveloping algebra of any affine Lie algebra, as shown by the Sugawara construction. In this sense, affine Lie algebras are extensions of the Virasoro algebra.

=== Meromorphic vector fields on Riemann surfaces ===
The Virasoro algebra is a central extension of the Lie algebra of meromorphic vector fields with two poles on a genus 0 Riemann surface. On a higher-genus compact Riemann surface, the Lie algebra of meromorphic vector fields with two poles also has a central extension, which is a generalization of the Virasoro algebra. This can be further generalized to supermanifolds.

=== Vertex algebras and conformal algebras ===
The Virasoro algebra also has vertex algebraic and conformal algebraic counterparts, which basically come from arranging all the basis elements into generating series and working with single objects.

== History ==
The Witt algebra (the Virasoro algebra without the central extension) was discovered by É. Cartan (1909). Its analogues over finite fields were studied by E. Witt in about the 1930s.

The central extension of the Witt algebra that gives the Virasoro algebra was first found (in characteristic p > 0) by R. E. Block (1966, page 381) and independently rediscovered (in characteristic 0) by I. M. Gelfand and Dmitry Fuchs (1969).

The physicist Miguel Ángel Virasoro (1970) wrote down some operators generating the Virasoro algebra (later known as the Virasoro operators) while studying dual resonance models, though he did not find the central extension. The central extension giving the Virasoro algebra was rediscovered in physics shortly after by J. H. Weis, according to Brower and Thorn (1971, footnote on page 167).

== See also ==
- Conformal field theory
- Goddard–Thorn theorem
- Heisenberg algebra
- Lie conformal algebra
- Pohlmeyer charge
- Super Virasoro algebra
- W-algebra
- Witt algebra
- WZW model
