= Lie conformal algebra =

Generalization of a Lie algebra

A Lie conformal algebra is in some sense a generalization of a Lie algebra in that it too is a "Lie algebra," though in a different pseudo-tensor category. Lie conformal algebras are very closely related to vertex algebras and have many applications in other areas of algebra and integrable systems.

== Definition and relation to Lie algebras ==
A Lie algebra is defined to be a vector space with a skew symmetric bilinear multiplication which satisfies the Jacobi identity. More generally, a Lie algebra is an object, $L$ in the category of vector spaces (read: $\mathbb{C}$-modules) with a morphism

$$[\cdot,\cdot]:L\otimes L\rightarrow L$$

that is skew-symmetric and satisfies the Jacobi identity. A Lie conformal algebra, then, is an object $R$ in the category of $\mathbb{C}[\partial]$-modules with morphism

$$[\cdot_{\lambda}\cdot]:R\otimes R\rightarrow\mathbb{C}[\lambda]\otimes R$$

called the lambda bracket, which satisfies modified versions of bilinearity, skew-symmetry and the Jacobi identity:

$$[\partial a_\lambda b]=-\lambda[a_\lambda b], [a_\lambda \partial b] = (\lambda + \partial)[a_\lambda b],$$

$$[a_\lambda b]=-[b_{-\lambda-\partial}a], \,$$

$$[a_\lambda [b_\mu c]]-[b_\mu [a_\lambda c]]=[[a_\lambda b]_{\lambda+\mu}c]. \,$$

One can see that removing all the lambda's, mu's and partials from the brackets, one simply has the definition of a Lie algebra.

== Examples of Lie conformal algebras ==
A simple and very important example of a Lie conformal algebra is the Virasoro conformal algebra. Over $\mathbb{C}[\partial]$ it is generated by a single element $L$ with lambda bracket given by

$$[L_ \lambda L] = (2\lambda + \partial)L. \,$$

In fact, it has been shown by Wakimoto that any Lie conformal algebra with lambda bracket satisfying the Jacobi identity on one generator is actually the Virasoro conformal algebra.

== Classification ==
It has been shown that any finitely generated (as a $\mathbb{C}[\partial]$-module) simple Lie conformal algebra is isomorphic to either the Virasoro conformal algebra, a current conformal algebra or a semi-direct product of the two.

There are also partial classifications of infinite subalgebras of $\mathfrak{gc}_n$ and $\mathfrak{cend}_n$.
