= Witt algebra =

Algebra of meromorphic vector fields on the Riemann sphere

In mathematics, the complex Witt algebra, named after Ernst Witt, is the Lie algebra of meromorphic vector fields defined on the Riemann sphere that are holomorphic except at two fixed points. It is also the complexification of the Lie algebra of polynomial vector fields on a circle, and the Lie algebra of derivations of the ring C[z,z^{−1}].

There are some related Lie algebras defined over finite fields, that are also called Witt algebras.

The complex Witt algebra was first defined by Élie Cartan (1909), and its analogues over finite fields were studied by Witt in the 1930s.

== Basis ==
A basis for the Witt algebra is given by the vector fields $L_n=-z^{n+1} \frac{\partial}{\partial z}$, for n in $\mathbb Z$.

The Lie bracket of two basis vector fields is given by

$$[L_m,L_n]=(m-n)L_{m+n}.$$

This algebra has a central extension called the Virasoro algebra that is important in two-dimensional conformal field theory and string theory.

Note that by restricting n to 1,0,-1, one gets a subalgebra. Taken over the field of complex numbers, this is just the Lie algebra $\mathfrak{sl}(2,\mathbb{C})$ of the Lorentz group $\mathrm{SO}(3,1)$. Over the reals, it is the algebra sl(2,R) = su(1,1). Conversely, su(1,1) suffices to reconstruct the original algebra in a presentation.

== Over finite fields ==
Over a field k of characteristic p>0, the Witt algebra is defined to be the Lie algebra of derivations of the ring

k[z]/z^{p}

The Witt algebra is spanned by L_{m} for −1≤ m ≤ p−2.

== Images ==
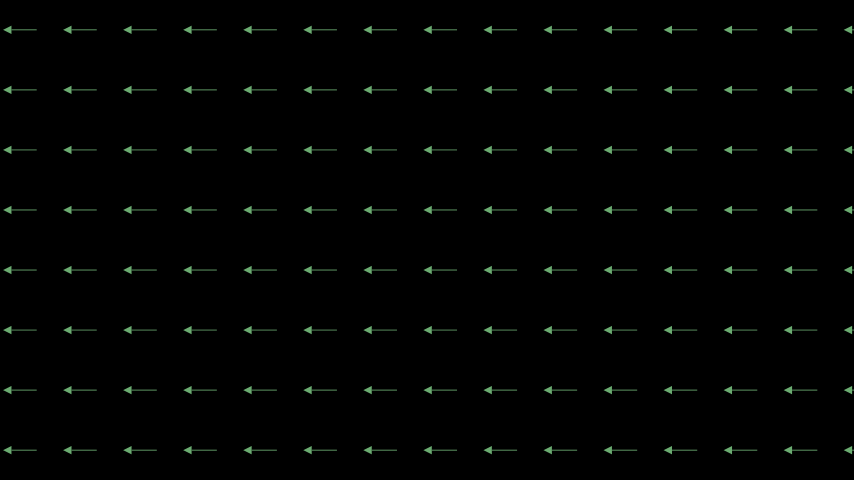
n = -1 Witt vector field

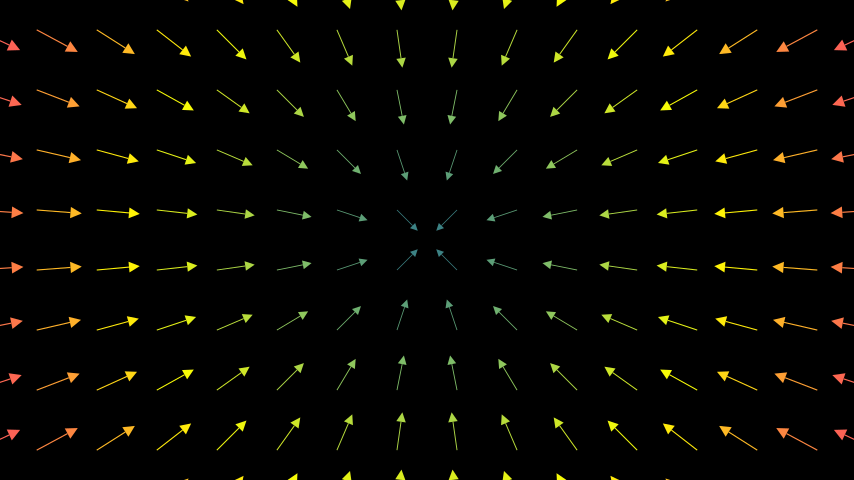
n = 0 Witt vector field

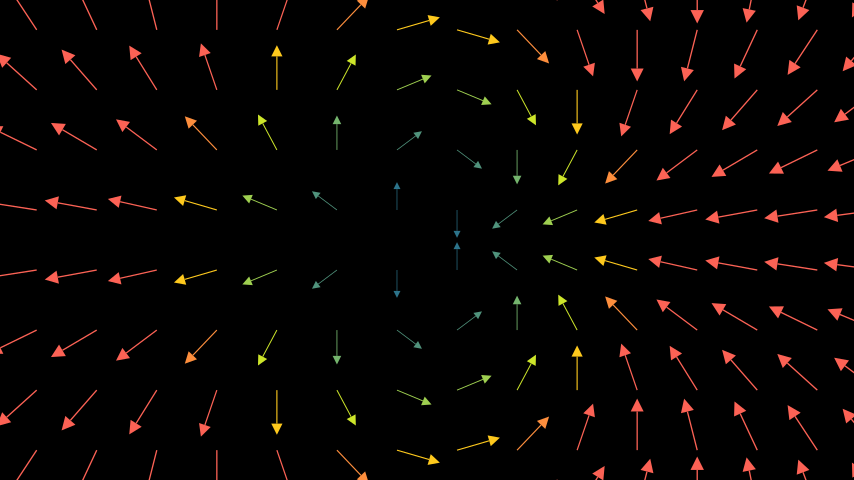
n = 1 Witt vector field

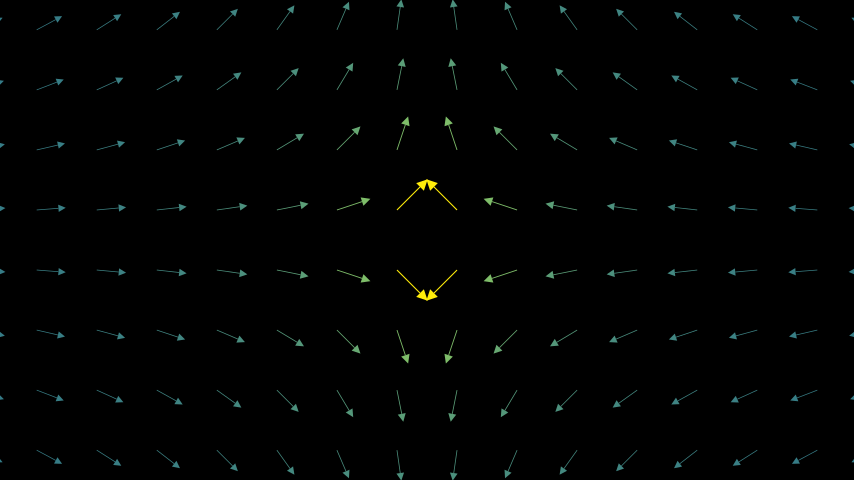
n = -2 Witt vector field

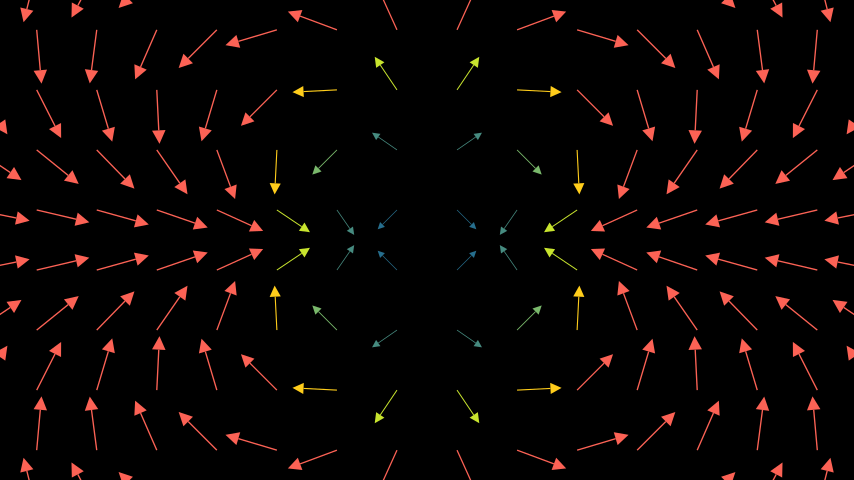
n = 2 Witt vector field

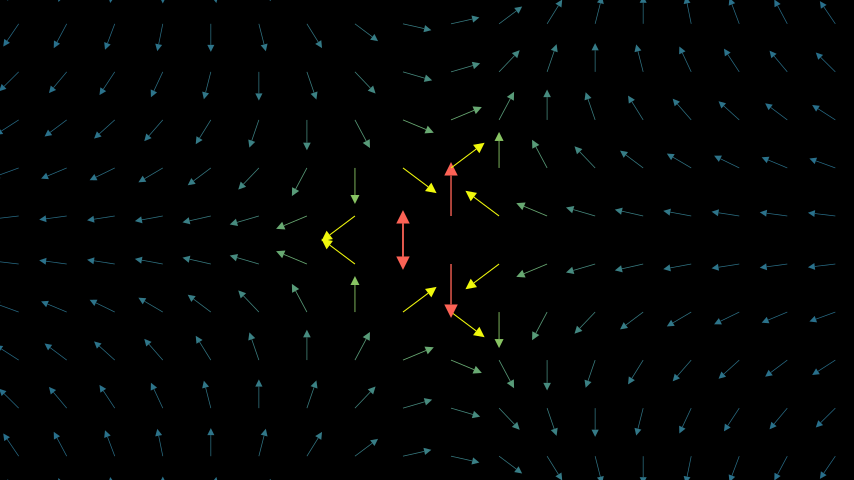
n = -3 Witt vector field

== See also ==
- Virasoro algebra
- Heisenberg algebra
