= Verlinde =

Verlinde is a surname. Notable people with the surname include:

- Erik Verlinde (born 1962), Dutch theoretical physicist and string theorist. Brother of Herman
- Herman Verlinde (born 1962), Dutch theoretical physicist and string theorist. Brother of Erik

== See also ==
- Verlinde algebra, associative algebra
