= Robbert Dijkgraaf =

Dutch politician, mathematical physicist and string theorist

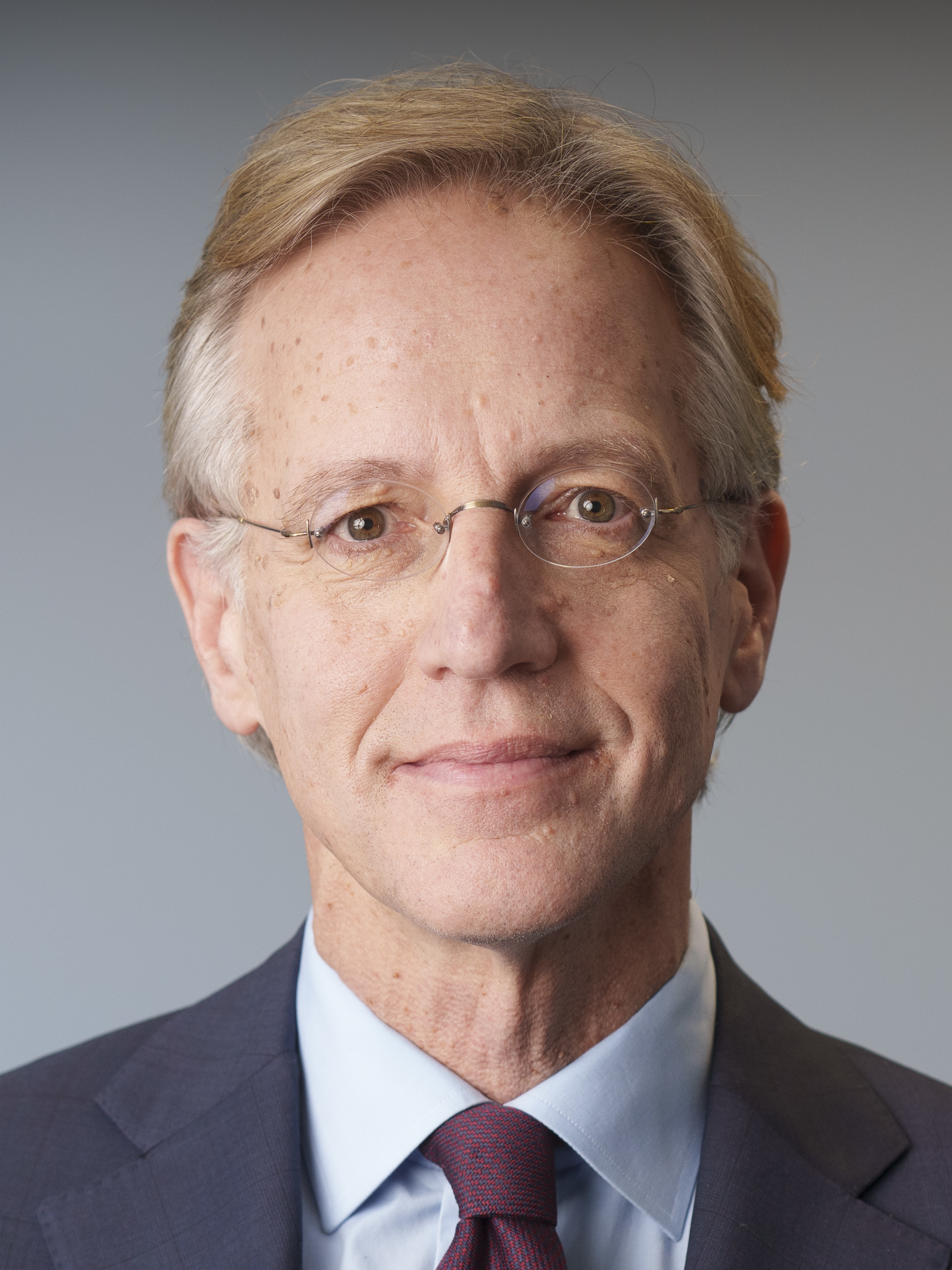
- Dijkgraaf in 2022

Minister of Education, Culture and Science
- In office 10 January 2022 – 2 July 2024
- Prime Minister: Mark Rutte
- Preceded by: Ingrid van Engelshoven
- Succeeded by: Eppo Bruins

Personal details
- Born: Robertus Henricus Dijkgraaf; 24 January 1960 (age 66) Ridderkerk, Netherlands
- Citizenship: Dutch
- Party: Democrats 66
- Website: Minister of Education, Culture and Science
- Scientific career
- Education: Utrecht University
- Known for: String theory
- Awards: Spinoza Prize (2003)
- Fields: Theoretical physics, mathematical physics
- Workplaces: Institute for Advanced Study; University of Amsterdam
- Thesis: A geometrical approach to two-dimensional Conformal Field Theory (1989)
- Doctoral advisor: Gerard 't Hooft
- Notable students: Lotte Hollands

Robertus Henricus "Robbert" Dijkgraaf, ForMemRS HonFRSE (Dutch pronunciation: [ˈrɔbərd ˈdɛikxraːf]; born 24 January 1960) is a Dutch theoretical physicist, mathematician and string theorist and former politician. He served as the Minister of Education, Culture and Science in the Netherlands from 2022 until 2024. From July 2012 until his inauguration as a minister, he had been the director and Leon Levy professor at the Institute for Advanced Study in Princeton, New Jersey, and a tenured professor at the University of Amsterdam. As of October 2026, Robbert is the president of the International Science Council.

== Early life and education ==
Robertus Henricus Dijkgraaf was born on 24 January 1960 in Ridderkerk, Netherlands. Dijkgraaf attended the Erasmiaans Gymnasium in Rotterdam, Netherlands.

He started his education in physics at Utrecht University in 1978. After completing his candidate's degree (equivalent to BSc degree) in 1982, he briefly turned away from physics to pursue a painting education at the Gerrit Rietveld Academie. In 1984, he returned to Utrecht University and obtained an MSc degree in theoretical physics in 1986. He then went on to performing doctoral research under supervision of future Nobel laureate Gerard 't Hooft. He studied together with the twins Erik and Herman Verlinde. The original arrangement was that only one of the trio would work on string theory, but all three ended up writing their thesis on this subject. Dijkgraaf obtained his PhD degree cum laude in 1989. His thesis was titled A Geometrical Approach to Two Dimensional Conformal Field Theory.

For a few years he worked as a postdoctoral researcher at the Institute for Advanced Study, working alongside Edward Witten.

== Work ==
In 1992, he was appointed professor of mathematical physics at the University of Amsterdam, a chair he held until 2004, when he was appointed distinguished professor at the same university.

From 2008 to 2012 he was president of the Royal Netherlands Academy of Arts and Sciences. He was elected as one of the two co-chairs of the InterAcademy Council for the period 2009 to 2013.

Starting in 2012, Dijkgraaf became the director of the Institute for Advanced Study, an independent academic institution located in the town of Princeton, New Jersey. On that date, he stepped down from his position as president of the Royal Netherlands Academy of Arts and Sciences.

He has served on numerous boards including at the Teylers Museum and the NEMO Science Museum.

He regularly appears on Dutch television and has a monthly column in the Dutch newspaper NRC Handelsblad.

== Political career ==
Starting on 10 January 2022, Dijkgraaf served as the Minister of Education in the Dutch government. He introduced the Balanced Internationalisation Act in the House of Representatives in 2024. This bill would allow colleges and universities to limit the number of foreign students they accept, and it would enforce stricter regulations on using the Dutch language in academic studies. Dijkgraaf's term as minister ended on 2 July 2024, when the Schoof cabinet was sworn in.

== Other activities ==
- Simons Foundation, Member of the Board of Directors (since 2021)
- Scholars at Risk (SAR), Member of the Ambassadors Council

== Awards and honours ==
In 1998 Dijkgraaf was an Invited Speaker at the International Congress of Mathematicians in Berlin.

In 2003, Dijkgraaf was awarded the Spinoza Prize. In doing so he became the first recipient of the award whose advisor also was a recipient (Gerard 't Hooft received the first Spinoza Prize in 1995). He used part of his Spinoza Prize grant to set up a website targeted at children and promoting science: Proefjes.nl.

Dijkgraaf is an elected Member of the Royal Netherlands Academy of Arts and Sciences since 2003 and of the Royal Holland Society of Sciences and Humanities.

On 30 May 2012, he was elected an Honorary Member of both the Royal Netherlands Chemical Society and the Netherlands' Physical Society. On 5 June 2012, Dijkgraaf was appointed a Knight of the Order of the Netherlands Lion. In 2012, he became a Fellow of the American Mathematical Society.

He was elected an Honorary Fellow of the Royal Society of Edinburgh (HonFRSE) in the disciplines of informatics, mathematics and statistics in 2013. That same year, he was elected as Member of the American Philosophical Society.

He received honorary doctorates from the Vrije Universiteit Brussel and Leiden University in 2019. In 2019, Dijkgraaf was awarded the inaugural Iris Medal for Excellent Science Communication, presented at the Evening of Science & Society in the Ridderzaal in The Hague, by Ingrid van Engelshoven, Minister of Education, Culture, and Science, in the presence of King Willem-Alexander.

He was appointed a Foreign Member of the Royal Society in 2025.

== Research ==
Dijkgraaf's research focuses on string theory and the interface of mathematics and physics in general. He is best known for his work on topological string theory and matrix models, and his name has been given to the Dijkgraaf-Witten invariants and the Witten-Dijkgraaf-Verlinde-Verlinde formula.

== Personal life ==
Dijkgraaf is married to the author Pia de Jong and has three children. Their daughter Charlotte was born with a rare type of Leukemia and was the subject of book written by her mother Pia de Jong, Saving Charlotte: A Mother and the Power of Intuition. Dijkgraaf is also known to have synesthesia, a phenomenon that causes him to see colours with names, numbers, letters, days, countries and persons.

== Electoral history ==
Electoral history of Robbert Dijkgraaf
Year	Body	Party	Pos.	Votes	Result		Ref.
Year	Body	Party	Pos.	Votes	Party seats	Individual	Ref.
2023	House of Representatives	Democrats 66	76 (Note: Dijkgraaf participated as a lijstduwer.)	3,247	9 / 150	Lost	
2025	House of Representatives	Democrats 66	49	5,280	26 / 150	Lost	
2026	Amsterdam Municipal Council	Democrats 66	48	593	8 / 45	Lost	
2026	Amsterdam-Centrum District Committee	Democrats 66	12	597	2 / 11	Lost	

== Bibliography ==
=== Research articles ===
Dijkgraaf has co-authored and published more than 70 research articles in the field of string theory and physics, with many other researchers including: Cumrun Vafa, Lotte Hollands, Erik Verlinde, Herman Verlinde, Hirosi Ooguri, Gregory Moore, Rajesh Gopakumar, Sergei Gukov, Miranda Cheng, and others. This is a select list of these works:

- Dijkgraaf, Robbert; Vafa, Cumrun (September 2009). "Toda Theories, Matrix Models, Topological Strings, and N=2 Gauge Systems". p. 41. arXiv:0909.2453 [hep-th].
- Dijkgraaf, Robbert; Orlando, Domenico; Reffert, Susanne (March 2009). "Quantum crystals and spin chains". Nuclear Physics B. 811 (3): 463–490. arXiv:0803.1927. Bibcode:2009NuPhB.811..463D. doi:10.1016/j.nuclphysb.2008.11.027. S2CID 8128961 – via Research Gate.
- Dijkgraaf, Robbert; Hollands, Lotte; Sulkowski, Piotr; Vafa, Cumrun (2008). "Supersymmetric Gauge Theories, Intersecting Branes and Free Fermions". Journal of High Energy Physics. 2008 (2): 106. arXiv:0709.4446. Bibcode:2008JHEP...02..106D. doi:10.1088/1126-6708/2008/02/106. S2CID 3827567 – via Research Gate.

=== Books ===
- Dijkgraaf, Robbert (2019). Het isgelijkteken [The Equal Sign] (in Dutch). Amsterdam, Netherlands: Publisher Prometheus BV (Uitgeverij Prometheus). ISBN 9789044640939.
- Flexner, Abraham (2017). "The Usefulness of Useless Knowledge". Medicina del Deporte y del Trabajo. 17 (117). Robbert Dijkgraaf (Commentary). Princeton University Press: 5274–8. ISBN 978-0691174761. PMID 13024481.
- Dijkgraaf, Robbert (2012). Het nut van nutteloos onderzoek [The usefulness of useless research] (in Dutch) (1 ed.). Amsterdam, Netherlands: Bert Bakker Publishing. ISBN 9789035138216.
- Dijkgraaf, Robbert (2008). Blikwisselingen [Changes of View] (in Dutch) (1 ed.). Amsterdam, Netherlands: Bert Bakker Publishing. ISBN 978-9035133365.
