= Witten–Dijkgraaf–Verlinde–Verlinde equations =

System of nonlinear partial differential equations

The Witten–Dijkgraaf–Verlinde–Verlinde (WDVV) equations are a system of nonlinear partial differential equations arising in the theory of Frobenius manifolds and quantum cohomology. In genus-zero Gromov–Witten theory, they express the associativity of the quantum product in terms of the third derivatives of a potential function.

They are named after Edward Witten, Robbert Dijkgraaf, Erik Verlinde, and Herman Verlinde.

Consider a supermanifold $M$ endowed with an $(A,g)$-structure, that is

- an even, symmetric, non-degenerate tensor $g$ of rank two
- and an even tensor $A$ of rank three.

The tensor $g$ defines a pairing on the tangent sheaf, while $A$ defines a multiplication on vector fields. The associativity of this multiplication imposes quadratic relations on the components of $A$.

An even local function $\Phi$ on $M$ is called a potential for the $(A,g)$-structure if

$$A_{abc}=\partial_a\partial_b\partial_c\Phi,$$

where $A_{abc}$ denotes the components of $A$ with one index lowered using $g$.

The associativity relations then define the WDVV equations:

$$\sum_{e,f}\partial_a\partial_b\partial_e\Phi\cdot g^{ef}\partial_f\partial_c\partial_d\Phi
=(-1)^{a(b+c)}
\sum_{e,f}\partial_b\partial_c\partial_e\Phi\cdot g^{ef}\partial_f\partial_a\partial_d\Phi,\qquad \forall a,b,c,d$$

where $(g^{ef})$ is the inverse matrix of $(g_{ef})$, and $a,b,c$ in the exponent denote the $\mathbb Z/2\mathbb Z$-degrees of the corresponding coordinates.

== Relative WDVV equation ==
The relative WDVV equation uses an extended space of insertions allowing positive and negative contact orders. Let $X$ be a smooth variety and $D\subset X$ a divisor, and set

$$H=\bigoplus_{i\in\mathbb Z}H_i,\qquad H_0=H^*(X),\quad H_i=H^*(D)\quad(i\neq 0).$$

The index $i$ records the contact order. We equip $H$ with the pairing induced by the Poincaré pairings on $X$ and $D$, which pairs $H_i$ with $H_{-i}$. For an $\alpha\in H_i$ we write $[\alpha]_i$ for its image in $H$.

Let ${\widetilde T^i_k}$ and ${\widetilde T^k_{-i}}$ be dual bases with respect to this pairing and denote the corresponding relative Gromov–Witten invariants by $I_\beta$. The relative WDVV equation is

$$\begin{aligned}\sum_{\beta_1+\beta_2=\beta}&I_{\beta_1}\left([\alpha_1]_{i_1},[\alpha_2]_{i_2},\prod_{j\in S_1}[\alpha_j]_{i_j},\widetilde T^i_k
\right)I_{\beta_2}\left(\widetilde T^k_{-i},[\alpha_3]_{i_3},[\alpha_4]_{i_4},\prod_{j\in S_2}[\alpha_j]_{i_j}\right)\\
={}&\sum_{\beta_1+\beta_2=\beta}I_{\beta_1}\left([\alpha_1]_{i_1},[\alpha_3]_{i_3},\prod_{j\in S_1}[\alpha_j]_{i_j},\widetilde T^i_k
\right)I_{\beta_2}\left(\widetilde T^k_{-i},[\alpha_2]_{i_2},[\alpha_4]_{i_4},\prod_{j\in S_2}[\alpha_j]_{i_j}\right)\end{aligned}$$

where the sums also run over the basis indices $i,k$ and all pairs of disjoint subsets $S_1,S_2$ with $S_1\cup S_2={5,\ldots,m}$.

== Literature ==
- Kontsevich, M.; Manin, Yu. (1994). "Gromov–Witten Classes, Quantum Cohomology, and Enumerative Geometry". Communications in Mathematical Physics. 164 (3): 525–562. arXiv:hep-th/9402147. doi:10.1007/BF02101490.
- Fan, Hua; Wu, Longting (2021). "Witten–Dijkgraaf–Verlinde–Verlinde Equation and its Application to Relative Gromov–Witten Theory". International Mathematics Research Notices. 2021 (13): 9834–9852. arXiv:1706.03463. doi:10.1093/imrn/rnz333.
