= Lotte Hollands =

Dutch mathematician and mathematical physicist

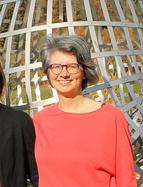
Hollands at Oberwolfach in 2025

Lotte Hollands (born 1981) is a Dutch mathematician and mathematical physicist who studies quantum field theory, supersymmetric gauge theory, and string theory. She is an associate professor and Royal Society Dorothy Hodgkin Fellow in the Department of Mathematics at Heriot-Watt University.

== Early life ==
Hollands was born in Maasbree, Netherlands.

== Education ==
Hollands earned her PhD at the University of Amsterdam in 2009. Her dissertation, Topological Strings and Quantum Curves, was supervised by Robbert Dijkgraaf. Dijkgraaf and Jim Bryan of the University of British Columbia jointly supervised Hollands' earlier master's thesis.

Hollands did her postdoctoral research with Sergei Gukov at the California Institute of Technology.

== Career ==
In 2013, Hollands became a research fellow at the University of Oxford. In 2015, Hollands became an associate professor at the Department of Math at Heriot-Watt University.

== Recognition ==
In 2018 the London Mathematical Society gave her their Anne Bennett Prize "in recognition of her outstanding research at the interface between quantum theory and geometry and of her leadership in mathematical outreach activities".
