= Luboš Motl =

Czech physicist and translator

- Motl in 2011
- Born: 5 December 1973 (age 52); Plzeň, Czechoslovakia (present-day Czech Republic)
- Education: Charles University (MA); Rutgers University (PhD)
- Known for: Matrix string theory; Weak gravity conjecture; The Reference Frame (blog)
- Scientific career
- Fields: Theoretical physics, String theory
- Thesis: Nonperturbative Formulations of Superstring Theory (2001)
- Doctoral advisor: Tom Banks

Luboš Motl (Czech: [ˈluboʃ ˈmotl̩]; born 5 December 1973) is a Czech physicist and blogger. He was an assistant professor in physics at Harvard University from 2004 to 2007. His scientific publications were focused on string theory.

== Life and career ==
Motl was born in Plzeň, present-day Czech Republic. He won a Bronze Medal at the 1992 International Mathematical Olympiad. He received his master's degree from the Charles University in Prague, and his Doctor of Philosophy degree from Rutgers University (2001) and has been a Harvard Junior Fellow (2001–2004) and assistant professor (2004–2007) at Harvard University. In 2007, he left Harvard and returned to the Czech Republic.

Although an undergraduate at a Czech university where none of the faculty specialized in string theory, Motl came to the attention of string theorist Thomas Banks in 1996, when Banks read an arXiv posting by Motl on matrix string theory. "I was at first a little annoyed by [Motl's] paper, because it scooped me," said Banks. "This feeling turned to awe when I realized that Lubos was still an undergraduate". He then became a graduate student of Banks, and wrote his PhD thesis on matrix theory. While at Harvard, Motl worked on the pp-wave limit of AdS/CFT correspondence, twistor theory and its application to gauge theory with supersymmetry, black hole thermodynamics and the conjectured relevance of quasinormal modes for loop quantum gravity, deconstruction, and other topics. In 2006, he proposed the weak gravity conjecture with Nima Arkani-Hamed, Alberto Nicolis and Cumrun Vafa.

He is the author of L'équation Bogdanov, a 2008 French-language book discussing the scientific ideas and controversy of the Bogdanov brothers.

Motl has not been publishing scientific papers since 2015.

== The Reference Frame ==
For many years, Motl wrote a science and politics blog called "The Reference Frame: Supersymmetric world from a conservative viewpoint", in which he expresses his scientific and right-wing political opinions, including invectives as well as personal insults. The blog has been described by George Musser as an "over-the-top" defense of string theory, defining one of the extremes of scientific opinions on that topic, with the other extreme being represented by Peter Woit. Following the example of Oriana Fallaci, Motl characterizes himself as a Christian atheist. He also describes himself as a "champion of the consistent histories interpretation of quantum mechanics", and has strongly criticised Erik Verlinde's entropic gravity theory. In April 2022, Motl retired the blog, citing censorship pressures and general dissatisfaction.
