= Zamolodchikov =

Zamolodchikov (Russian: Замолодчиков) is a Russian masculine surname, its feminine counterpart is Zamolodchikova. It may refer to

- Alexander Zamolodchikov (born 1952), Russian physicist, twin brother of Alexei
- Alexei Zamolodchikov (1952–2007), Russian physicist
- Elena Zamolodchikova (born 1982), Russian gymnast
- Katya Zamolodchikova, stage name of the American drag queen Brian McCook (born 1982)
