= Frobenius manifold =

In the mathematical field of differential geometry, a Frobenius manifold, introduced by Dubrovin, is a flat Riemannian manifold with a certain compatible multiplicative structure on the tangent space. The concept generalizes the notion of Frobenius algebra to tangent bundles.

Frobenius manifolds occur naturally in the subject of symplectic topology, more specifically quantum cohomology. The broadest definition is in the category of Riemannian supermanifolds. We will limit the discussion here to smooth (real) manifolds. A restriction to complex manifolds is also possible.

== Definition ==
Let M be a smooth manifold. An affine flat structure on M is a sheaf T^{f} of vector spaces that pointwisely span TM the tangent bundle and the tangent bracket of pairs of its sections vanishes.

As a local example consider the coordinate vectorfields over a chart of M. A manifold admits an affine flat structure if one can glue together such vectorfields for a covering family of charts.

Let further be given a Riemannian metric g on M. It is compatible to the flat structure if g(X, Y) is locally constant for all flat vector fields X and Y.

A Riemannian manifold admits a compatible affine flat structure if and only if its curvature tensor vanishes everywhere.

A family of commutative products * on TM is equivalent to a section A of S^{2}(T^{*}M) ⊗ TM via

$$X*Y = A(X,Y). \,$$

We require in addition the property

$$g(X*Y,Z)=g(X,Y*Z). \,$$

Therefore, the composition g^{#}∘A is a symmetric 3-tensor.

Given (g, T^{f}, A), a local potential Φ is a local smooth function such that

$$g(A(X,Y),Z)=X[Y[Z[\Phi]]] \,$$

for all flat vector fields X, Y, and Z.

A Frobenius manifold (M, g, *) is now a flat Riemannian manifold (M, g) with symmetric 3-tensor A that admits everywhere a local potential and is associative. It follows, in particular, that a linear Frobenius manifold (M, g, *) with constant product is a Frobenius algebra M.

== Elementary properties ==
The associativity of the product * is equivalent to the following quadratic PDE in the local potential Φ

$$\Phi_{,abe}g^{ef}\Phi_{,cdf} = \Phi_{,ade}g^{ef}\Phi_{,bcf} \,$$

where Einstein's sum convention is implied, Φ_{,a} denotes the partial derivative of the function Φ by the coordinate vectorfield ∂/∂x^{a} which are all assumed to be flat. g^{ef} are the coefficients of the inverse of the metric.

The equation is therefore called associativity equation or Witten–Dijkgraaf–Verlinde–Verlinde (WDVV) equation.

== Examples ==
Beside Frobenius algebras, examples arise from quantum cohomology. Namely, given a semipositive symplectic manifold (M, ω) then there exists an open neighborhood U of 0 in its even quantum cohomology QH^{even}(M, ω) with Novikov ring over C such that the big quantum product *_{a} for a in U is analytic. Now U together with the intersection form g = <·,·> is a (complex) Frobenius manifold.

The second large class of examples of Frobenius manifolds come from the singularity theory. Namely, the space of miniversal deformations of an isolated singularity has a Frobenius manifold structure. This Frobenius manifold structure also relates to Kyoji Saito's primitive forms.
