= Pyramid of Austerlitz =

Napoleonic monument in the Netherlands

Coordinates: 52.0903°N 5.3425°E

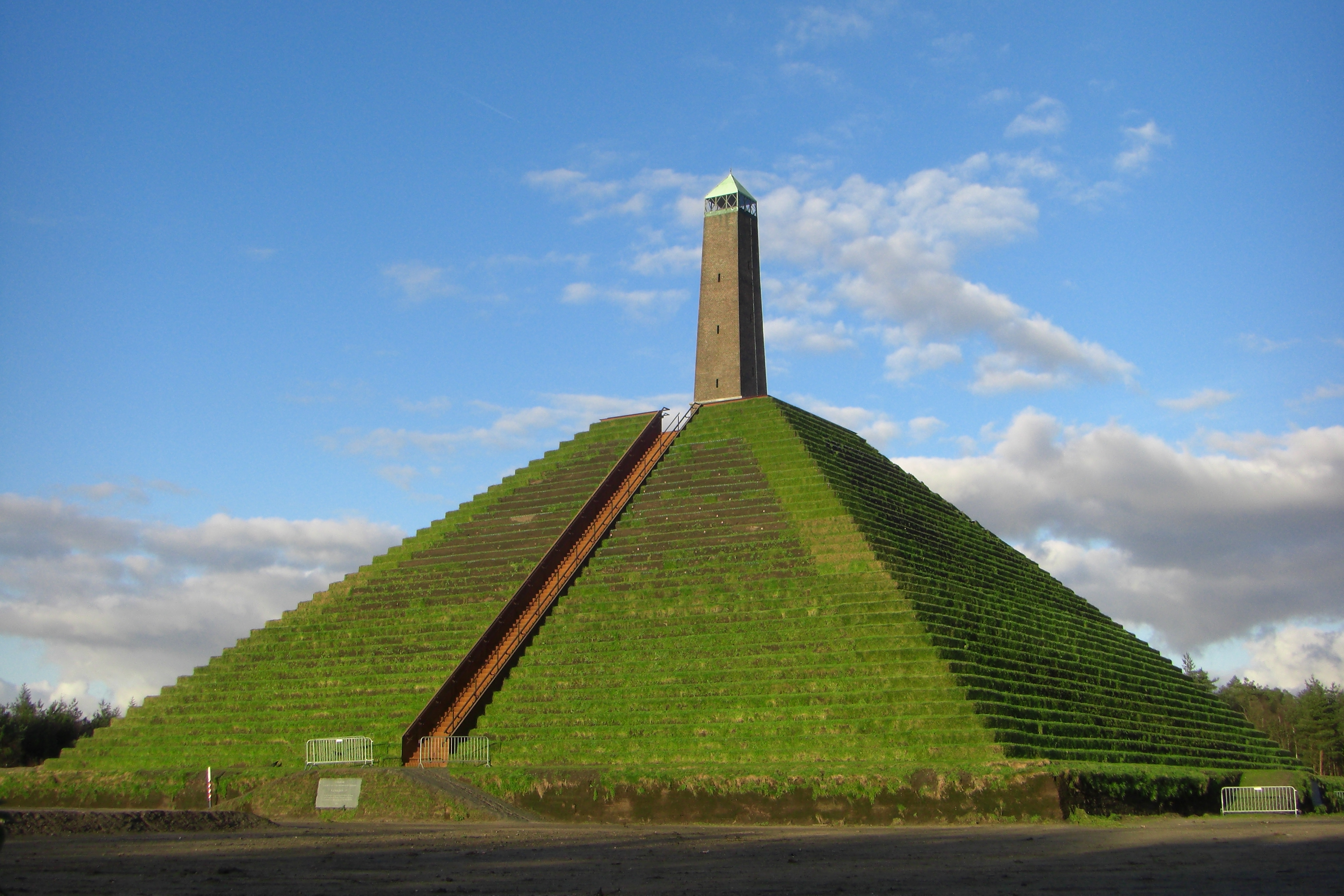
The Pyramid of Austerlitz, pictured in 2008

The Pyramid of Austerlitz is a 36-metre-high pyramid of earth, built in 1804 by Napoleon's soldiers on one of the highest points of the Utrecht Hill Ridge, in the municipality of Woudenberg, the Netherlands. On top of the pyramid is a stone obelisk from 1894.

== History ==
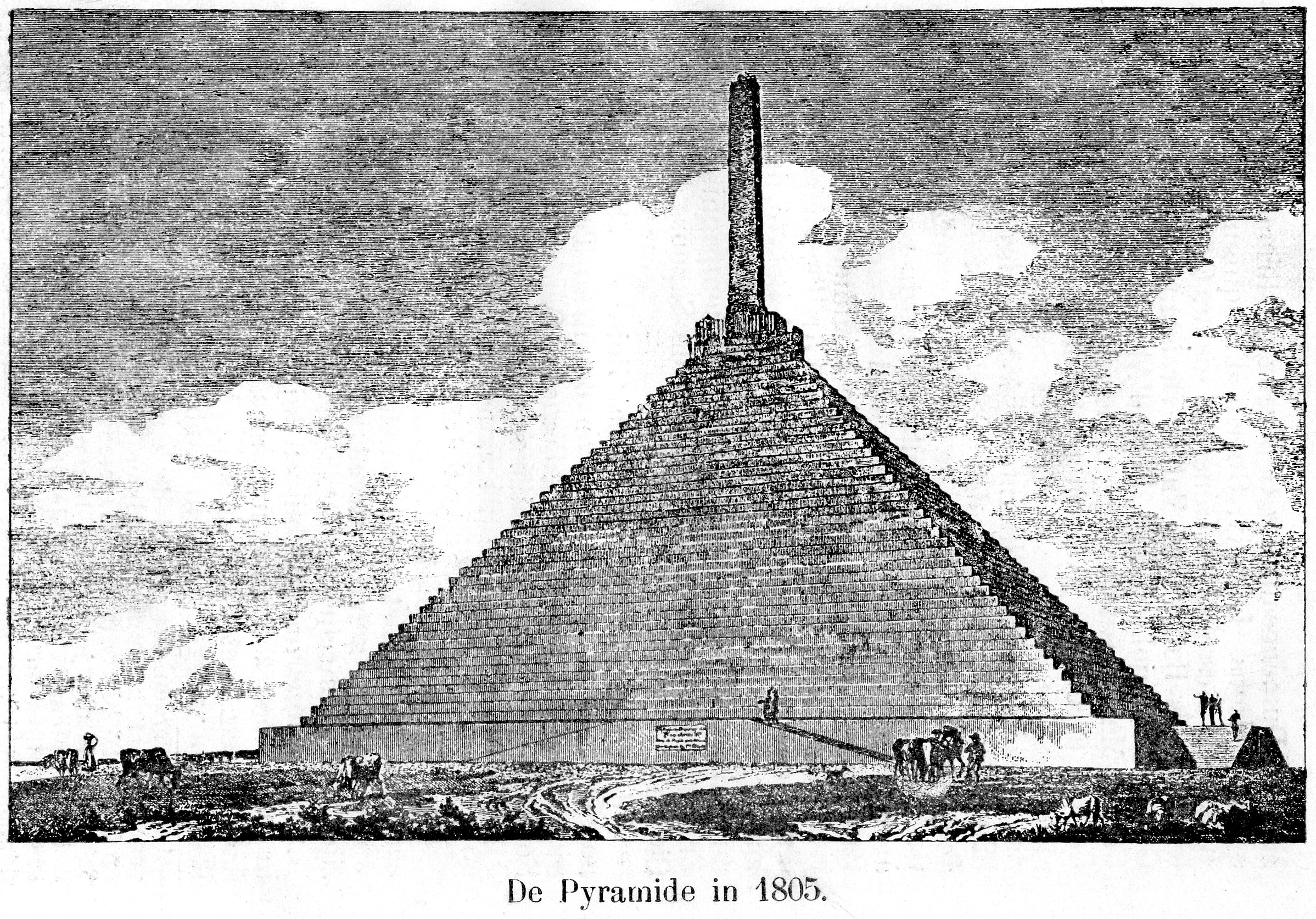
An 1805 engraving of the Pyramid of Austerlitz by Louis-Pierre Baltard

In 1804, the French General Auguste de Marmont established an army camp (le Camp d'Utrecht) in this central location in the Batavian Republic, the present Netherlands, where over a period of several months he forged together various battalions into a large, well-trained army, capable of beating the British enemy should there be any repetition of the invasion of 1799. In the autumn of 1804, satisfied with the military power of the new army, and to occupy his bored soldiers, Marmont had his soldiers build an earth and turf monument inspired by the Great Pyramid of Giza, which Marmont had seen in 1798 during Napoleon's Egyptian campaign. Even the erosion-exposed stepped surface was imitated. Construction lasted 27 days. The pyramid hill was 36 metres (118 ft) high, and surmounted by a 13-metre (43 ft) wooden obelisk. It was named "Mont Marmont" or "Marmontberg".

In the summer of 1805, Marmont departed with his army to southern Germany to fight in the War of the Third Coalition, which culminated in the Battle of Austerlitz (now Slavkov u Brna), the battle in which Napoleon decisively defeated the Russians and Austrians.

In 1806, despite protests from Marmont, Louis Bonaparte, the new king of Holland, renamed the hill the Pyramid of Austerlitz, and gave the same name to the trading post at the nearby camp of Bois-en-Ville.

After leaving the Netherlands in 1805, Marmont gave the monument and the use of the nearby homestead Henschoten to three soldiers, Louis Faivre, Jean Baptiste La Rouche and Barend Philpsz, who were also to maintain the pyramid. Nevertheless, the wooden obelisk soon deteriorated, and was demolished in 1808. In 1816 the Marmont pyramid and its associated land were sold to the future mayor of Utrecht, Hubert MAJ van Asch van Wijk.

In 1894, Johannes Bernardus de Beaufort, who both owned the Henschoten estate on which the pyramid stood and was mayor of Woudenberg, had the current stone obelisk built on the pyramid. This also began to collapse.

== Restoration ==
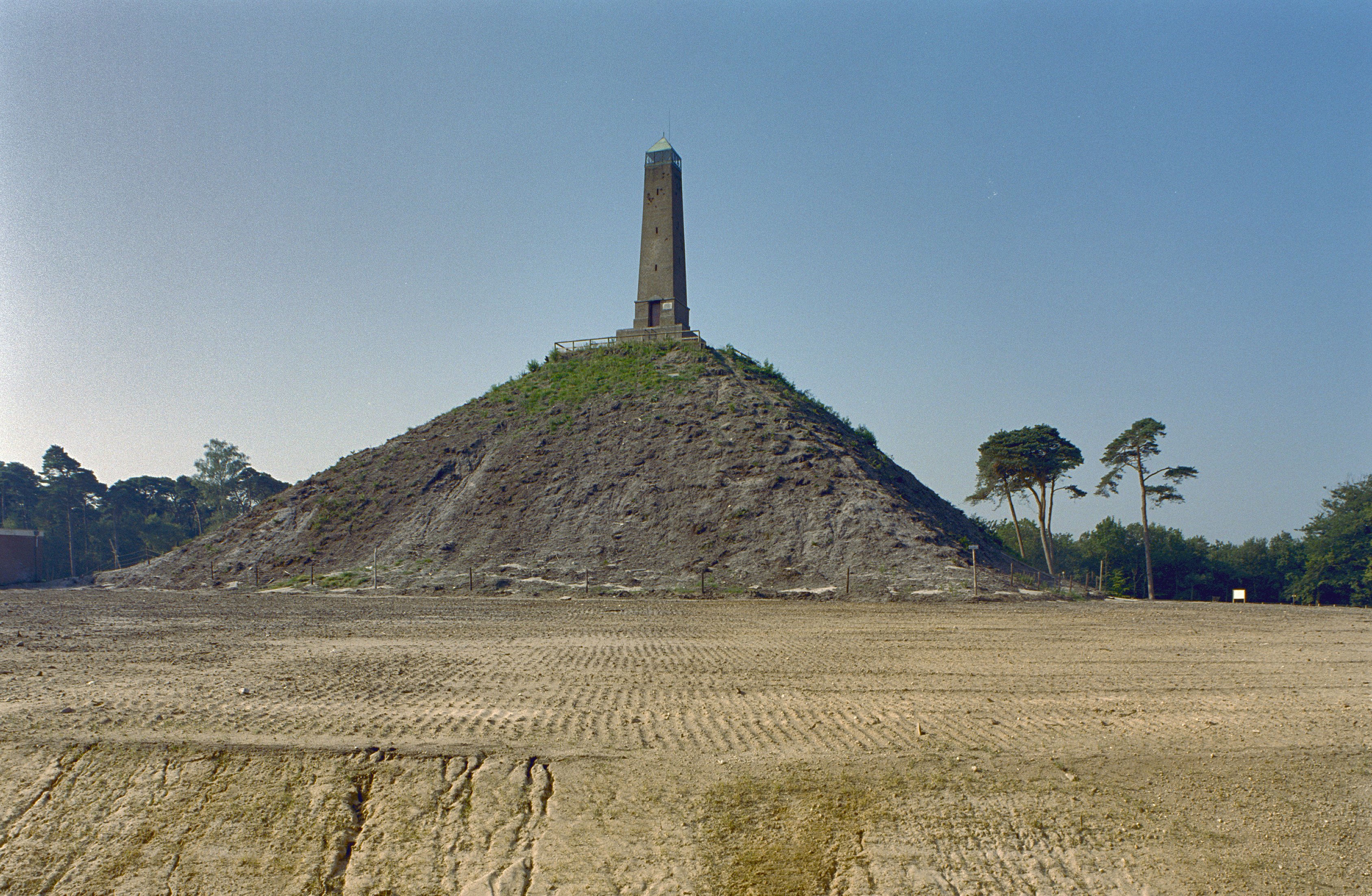
The Pyramid of Austerlitz in 2002, during its restoration

In view of its 200th anniversary in 2004, the highly dilapidated pyramid was restored between 2001 and 2004. This was done on the initiative of the province of Utrecht, the Den Treek-Henschoten estate and the municipality of Woudenberg, which had previously set up the Austerlitz Pyramid Foundation.

The very dry summer of 2003, followed by heavy rain in 2004, caused further subsidence, and restoration was resumed in 2007. The pyramid was reopened to visitors in 2008, along with a new visitor centre interpreting the period of French rule in the Netherlands. Further piling was carried out in 2010 and 2012 to stabilise the mound.

The Pyramid of Austerlitz is an inspiration for the larger Lion of Waterloo, the pyramid built by King William I as a monument to the Battle of Waterloo where Napoleon was defeated. The mound marks the spot where his son William II was injured.

The Pyramid is a national monument, monument number 39543.

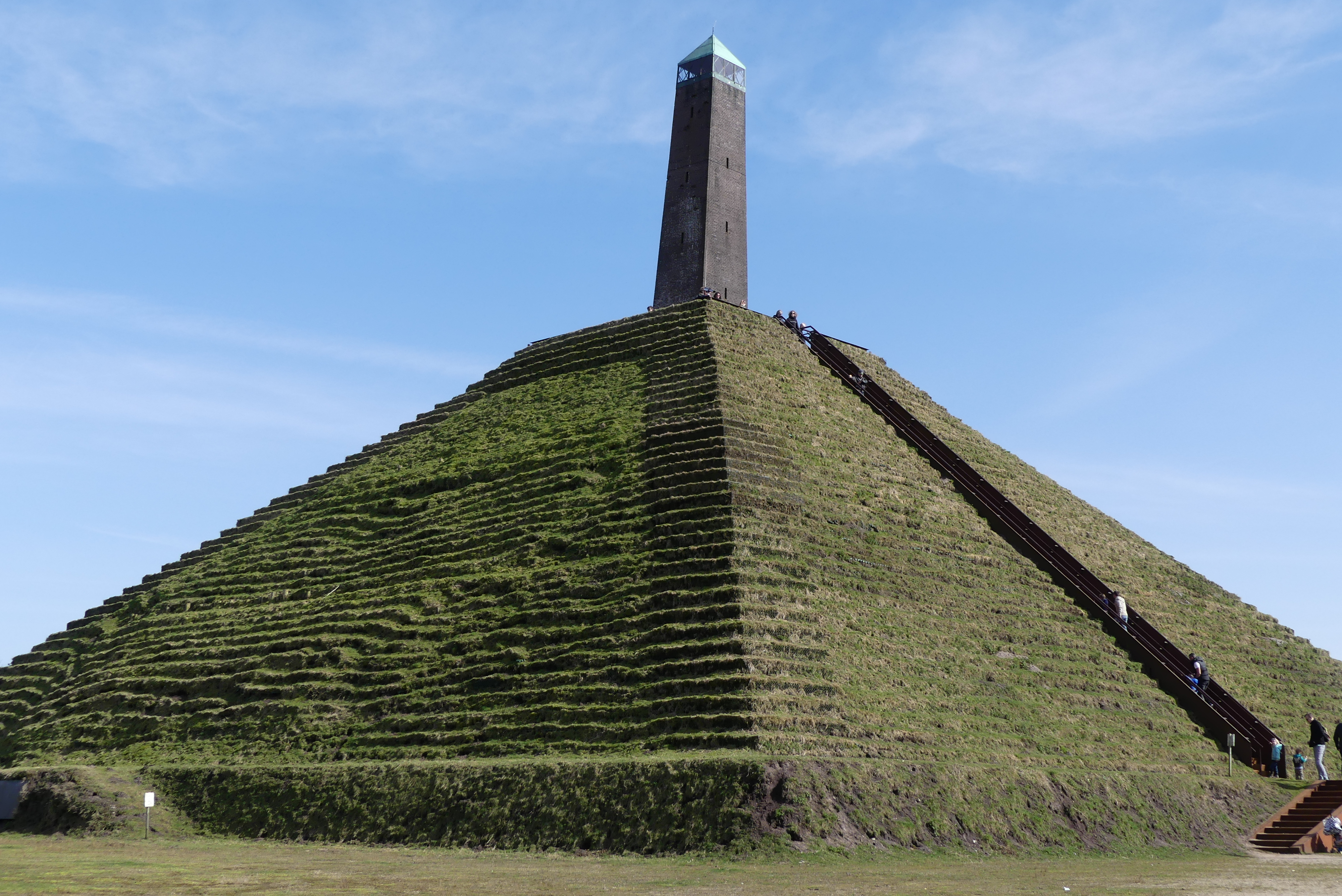
The Pyramid of Austerlitz in 2017
