= Woudenberg =

- Town and municipality
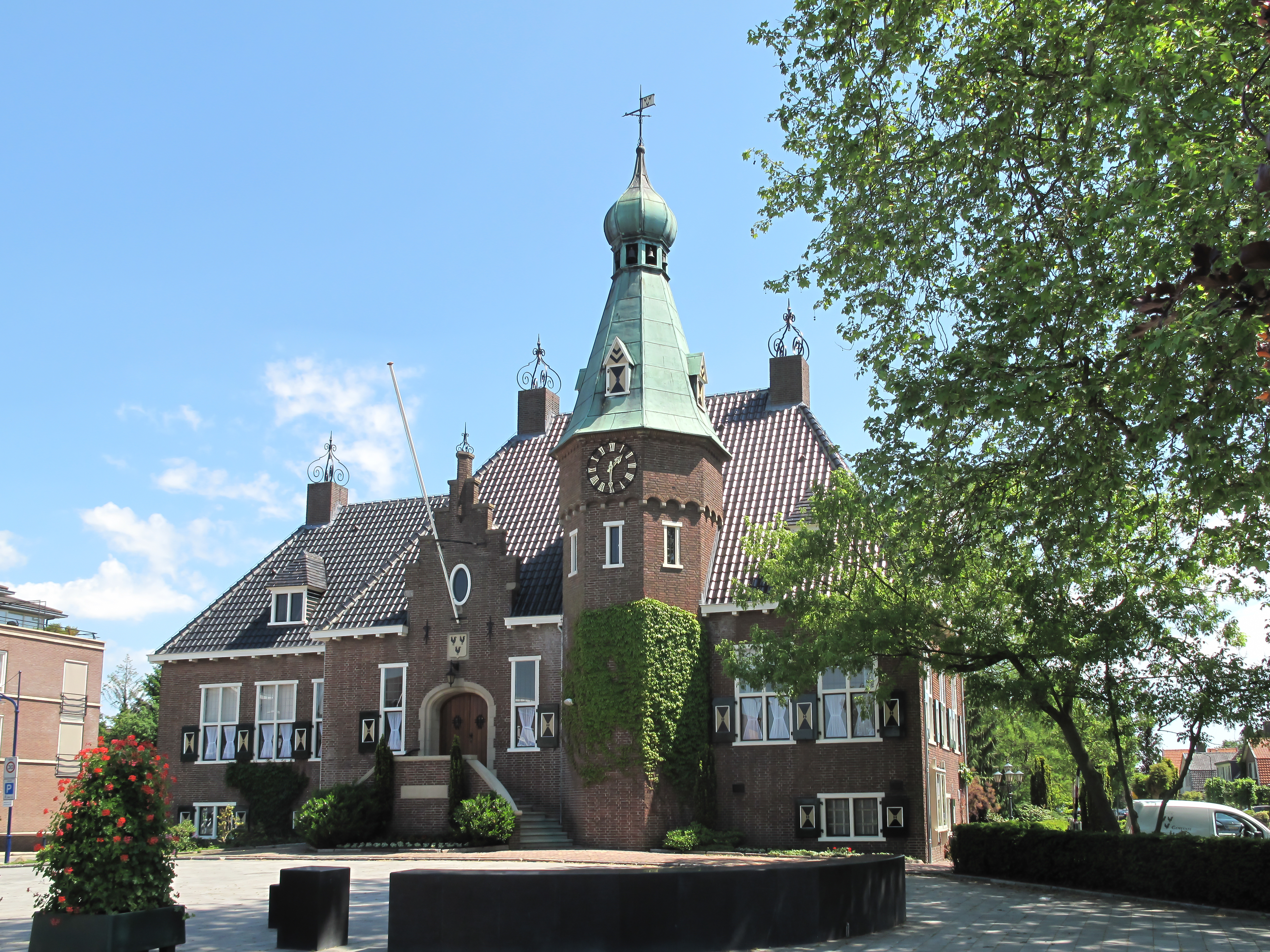
- Woudenberg Town Hall

- Flag Coat of arms

- Location in Utrecht
- Coordinates: 52°5′N 5°25′E
- Country: Netherlands
- Province: Utrecht

Government
  - Body: Municipal council
  - Mayor: Magda Jansen-van Harten (none)

Area
  - Total: 36.82 km^{2} (14.22 sq mi)
  - Land: 36.53 km^{2} (14.10 sq mi)
  - Water: 0.29 km^{2} (0.11 sq mi)
- Elevation: 3 m (9.8 ft)

Population (January 2021)
  - Total: 13,639
  - Density: 373/km^{2} (970/sq mi)
- Time zone: UTC+1 (CET)
  - Summer (DST): UTC+2 (CEST)
- Postcode: 3930–3931
- Area code: 033
- Website: www.woudenberg.nl

Woudenberg (Dutch pronunciation: [ˈʋʌudə(m)ˌbɛr(ə)x]) is a town and municipality in the central Netherlands, in the province of Utrecht. On 23 July 2025 its population reached 15,000.

There are forests in the western part of the municipality in which the Pyramid of Austerlitz is located. The municipality also borders the province of Gelderland to the east.

== Etymology ==
The name Woudenberg refers to a forested hill; nowadays the town lies in an agricultural area about 8 km south of Amersfoort.

== Topography ==
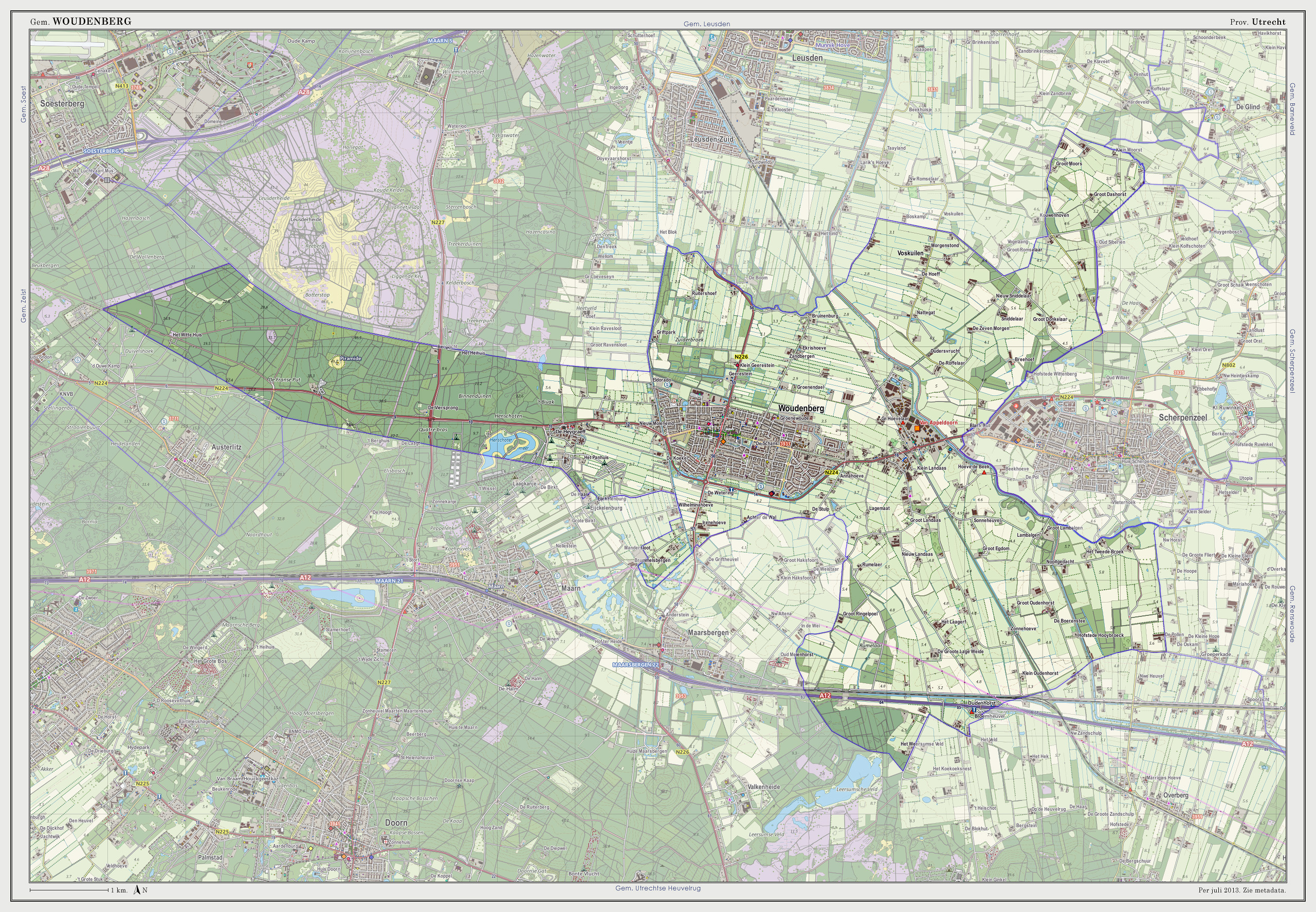

Dutch Topographic map of the municipality of Woudenberg, 2013.

== Economy ==
The main sources of income were the raising of livestock and the cultivation of tobacco. Currently, most people work out of town, mostly in the surrounding towns of Amersfoort, Utrecht and Veenendaal.

== Tourism ==
Because of the many attractions nearby, such as the Grebbe, the Pyramid of Austerlitz and the Henschotermeer, Woudenberg is visited by many tourists. That can also be derived from the number of tourist accommodation, which is 12.

== Notable people ==
- Arie de Vroet (1918 – 1999 in Woudenberg) footballer
- Erik Verlinde & Herman Verlinde (born 1962) identical twin brothers and theoretical physicists and string theorist
- Ricky van Wolfswinkel (born 1989) professional footballer

== Gallery ==
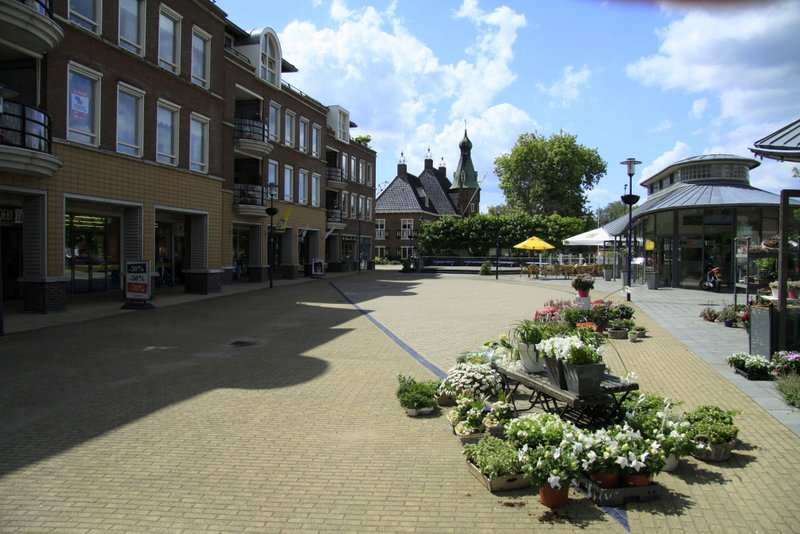
Town centre of Woudenberg looking towards the Raadhuis

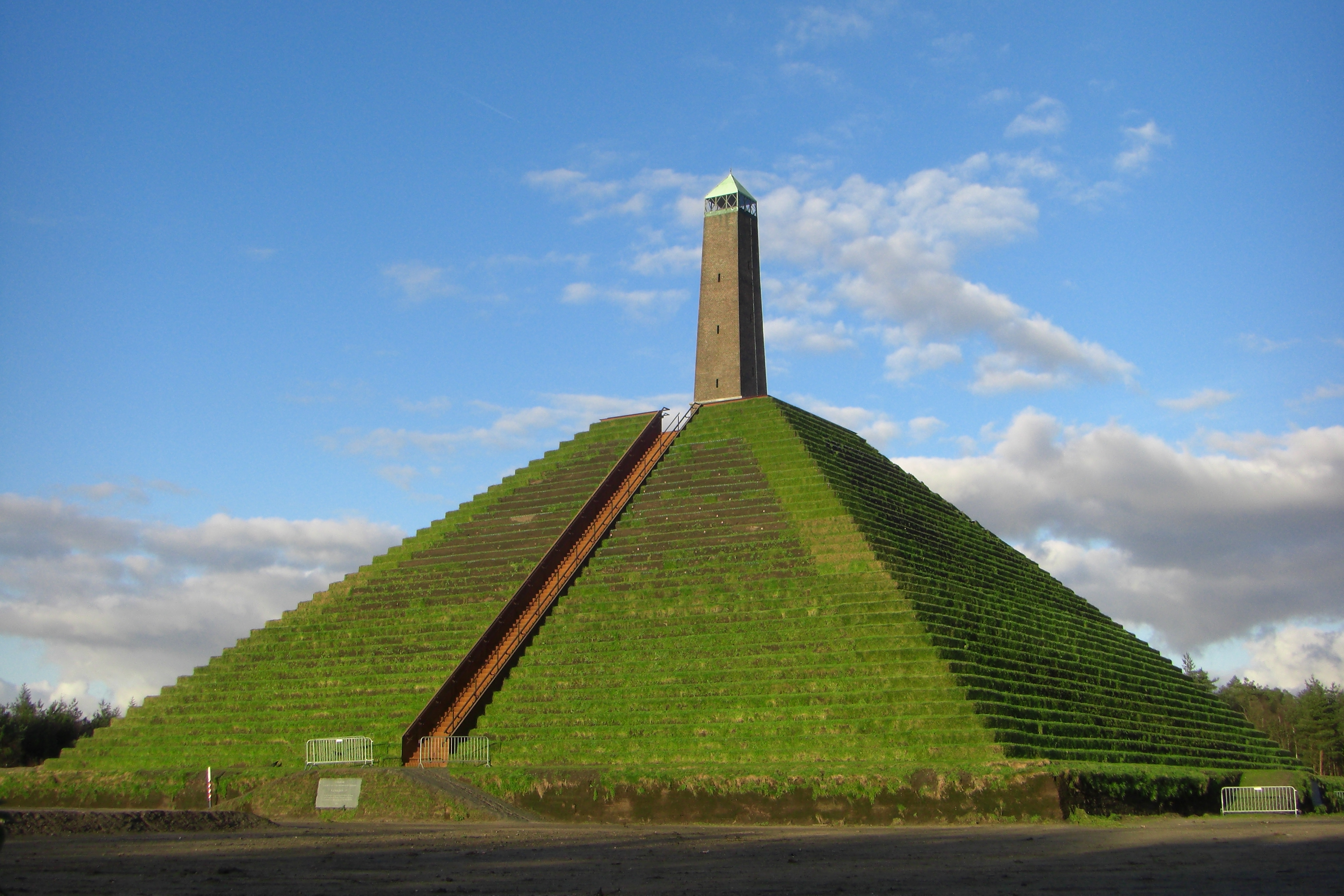
Pyramid of Austerlitz

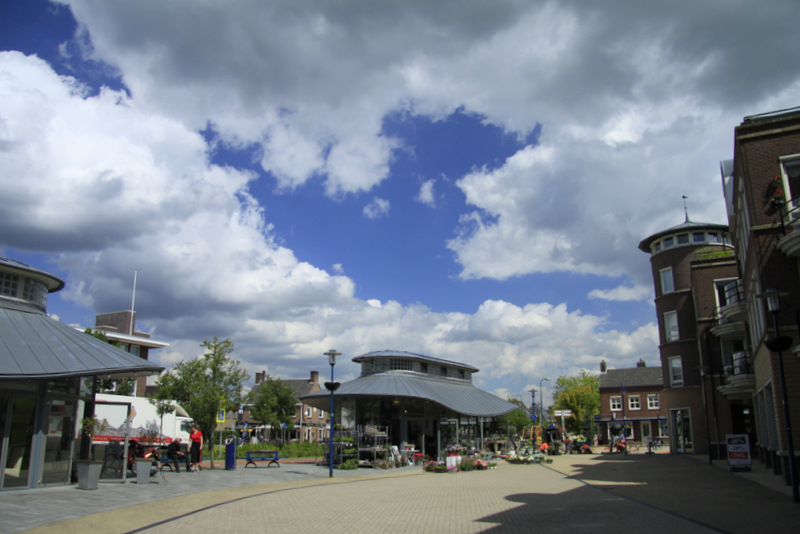
Modern Woudenberg

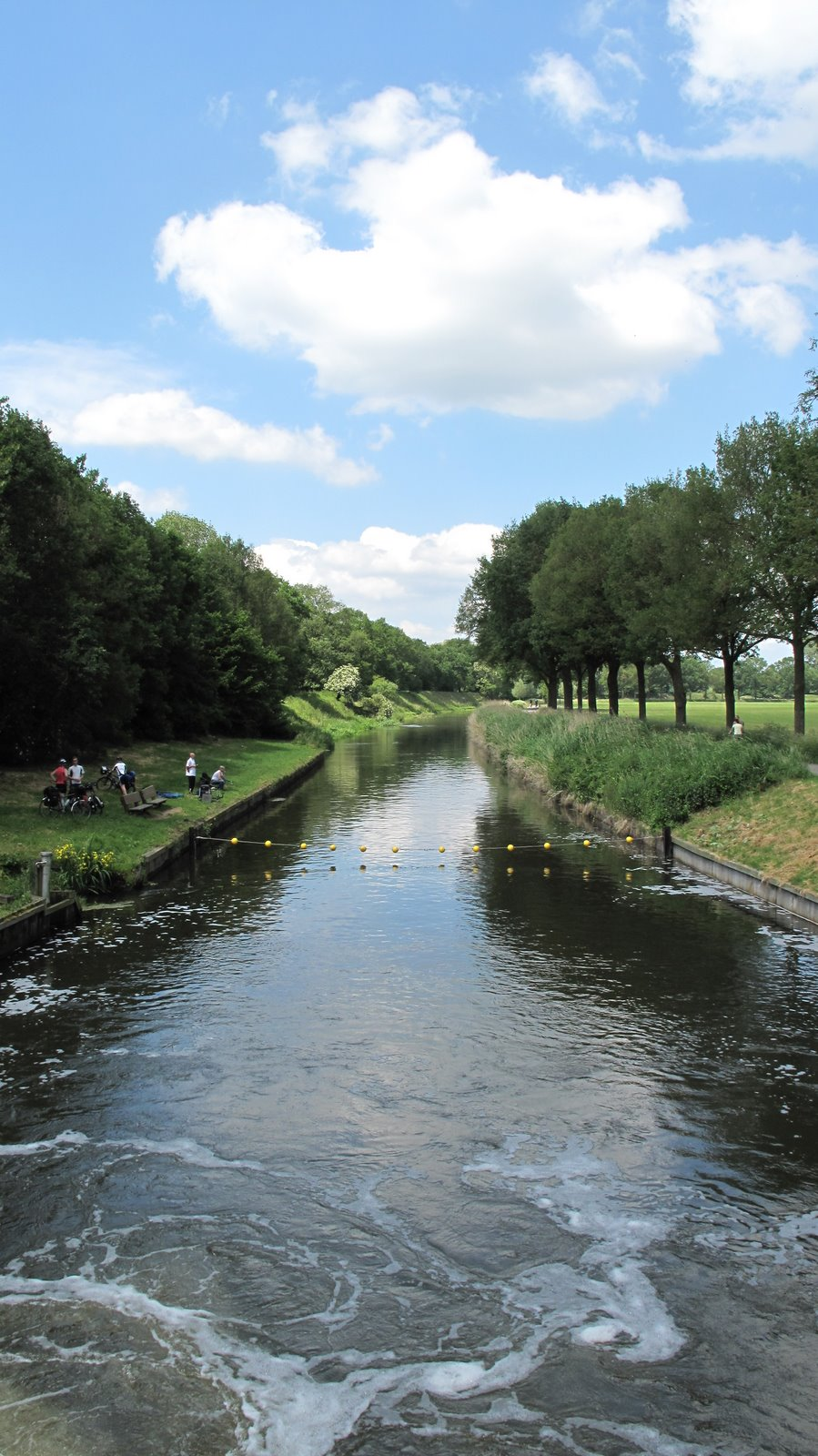
Woudenberg panoramio

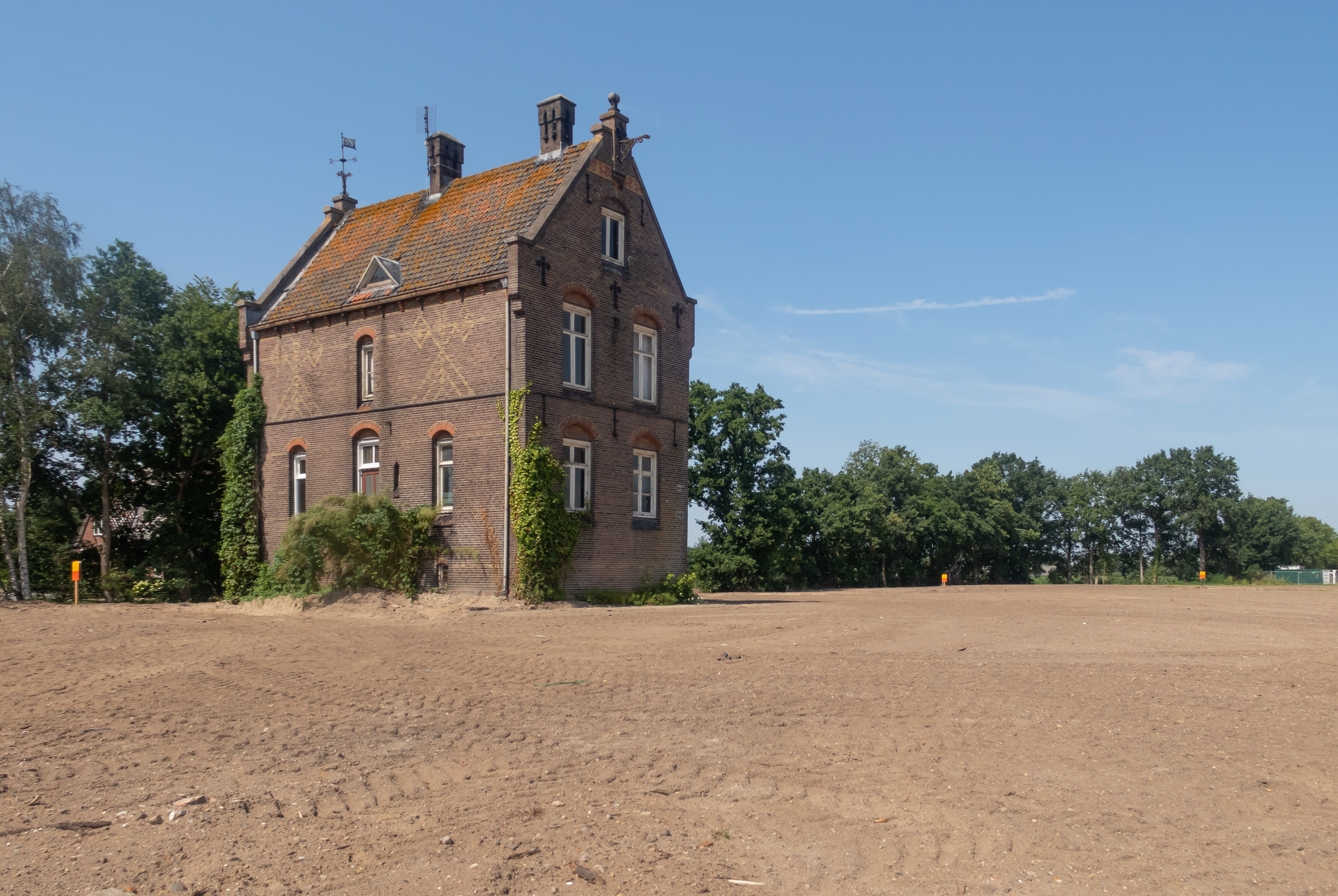
House near the station
