= Verlinde algebra =

Algebra used in certain conformal field theories

In mathematics, a Verlinde algebra is a finite-dimensional associative algebra introduced by Erik Verlinde (1988). It is defined to have basis of elements φ_{λ} corresponding to primary fields of a rational two-dimensional conformal field theory, whose structure constants N^{ν}_{λμ} describe fusion of primary fields.

In the context of modular tensor categories, there is also a Verlinde algebra. It is defined to have a basis of elements $[A]$ corresponding to isomorphism classes of simple obejcts and whose structure constants $N^{A,B}_{C}$ describe the fusion of simple objects.

== Verlinde formula ==
In terms of the modular S-matrix for modular tensor categories, the Verlinde formula is stated as follows. Given any simple objects $A,B,C\in\mathcal{C}$ in a modular tensor category, the Verlinde formula relates the fusion coefficient $N^{A,B}_{C}$ in terms of a sum of products of $S$-matrix entries and entries of the inverse of the $S$-matrix, normalized by quantum dimensions.

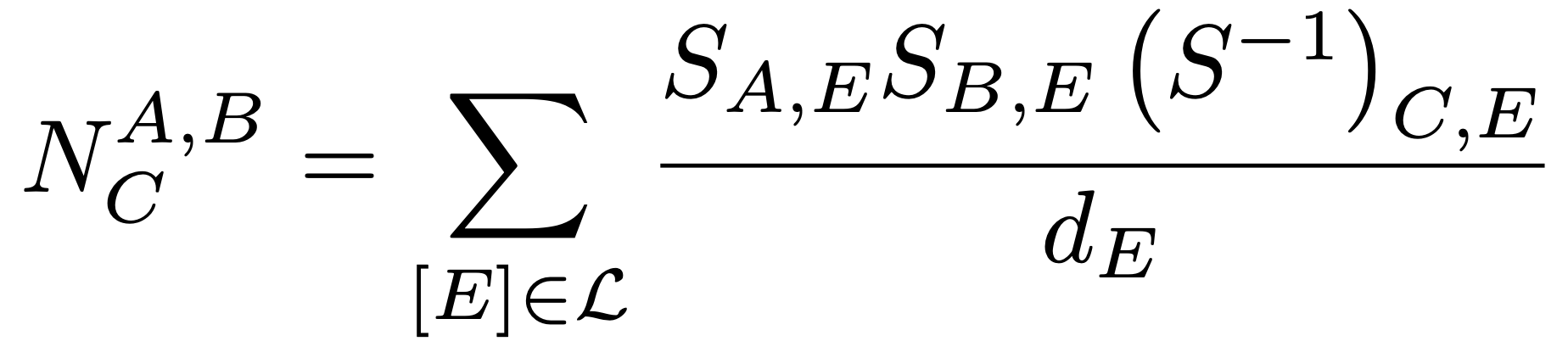
The Verlinde formula for modular tensor categories.

In terms of the modular S-matrix for conformal field theory, Verlinde formula expresses the fusion coefficients as

$$N_{\lambda \mu}^\nu = \sum_\sigma \frac{S_{\lambda \sigma} S_{\mu \sigma} S^*_{\sigma \nu}}{S_{0\sigma}}$$

where $S^*$ is the component-wise complex conjugate of $S$.

These two formulas are equivalent because under appropriate normalization the S-matrix of every modular tensor category can be made unitary, and the S-matrix entry $S_{0\sigma }$ is equal to the quantum dimension of $\sigma$.

== Twisted equivariant K-theory ==
If G is a compact Lie group, there is a rational conformal field theory whose primary fields correspond to the representations λ of some fixed level of loop group of G. For this special case Freed, Hopkins & Teleman (2001) showed that the Verlinde algebra can be identified with twisted equivariant K-theory of G.

== See also ==
- Fusion rules
