= Fusion rules =

Tensor product decomposition rules in representation theory

In mathematics and theoretical physics, fusion rules are rules that determine the exact decomposition of the tensor product of two representations of a group into a direct sum of irreducible representations. The term is often used in the context of two-dimensional conformal field theory where the relevant group is generated by the Virasoro algebra, the relevant representations are the conformal families associated with a primary field and the tensor product is realized by operator product expansions. The fusion rules contain the information about the kind of families that appear on the right-hand side of these OPEs, including the multiplicities.

More generally, integrable models in 2 dimensions which are not conformal field theories are also described by fusion rules for their charges.

== See also ==
- Fusion of anyons
- Virasoro conformal block § Fusing matrix
- Two-dimensional conformal field theory § Fusion rules
- Fusion category
- Non-invertible symmetry
- Verlinde algebra
