= Matrix string theory =

Set of equations that describe superstring theory in a non-perturbative framework

In physics, matrix string theory is a set of equations that describe superstring theory in a non-perturbative framework. Type IIA string theory can be shown to be equivalent to a maximally supersymmetric two-dimensional gauge theory, the gauge group of which is U(N) for a large value of N. This matrix string theory was first proposed by Luboš Motl in 1997 and later independently in a more complete paper by Robbert Dijkgraaf, Erik Verlinde, and Herman Verlinde. Another matrix string theory equivalent to Type IIB string theory was constructed in 1996 by Ishibashi, Kawai, Kitazawa and Tsuchiya.

== See also ==
- Matrix theory (physics)
