= Arie de Vroet =

Dutch footballer and manager

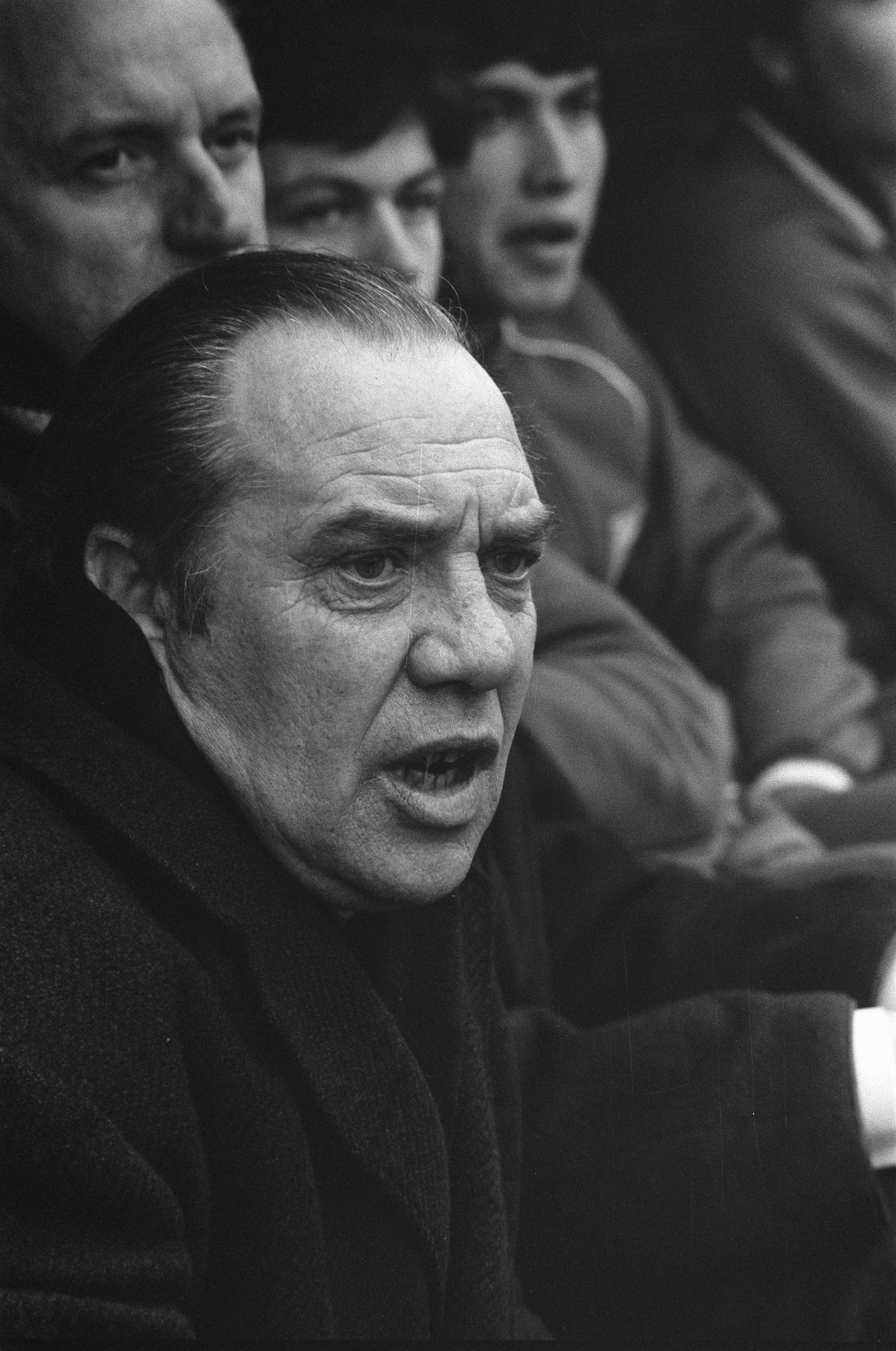

Personal information
- Full name: Arie de Vroet
- Date of birth: 9 November 1918
- Place of birth: Oud-Beijerland, Netherlands
- Date of death: 9 September 1999 (aged 80)
- Place of death: Woudenberg, Netherlands
- Position: Forward

Youth career
- Feijenoord

Senior career*
Years	Team	Apps	(Gls)
1938–1950	Feijenoord	230	(31)
1950–1952	Le Havre AC	64	(2)
1952–1953	FC Rouen	24	(2)

International career^{‡}
1938–1949	Netherlands	22	(0)

Managerial career
- 1953–1955: Be Quick 1887
- 1955–1956: Velocitas Groningen
- 1956–1957: Be Quick 1887
- 1957–1959: SVV Schiedam
- 1959–1961: Be Quick 1887
- 1961–1963: SC Heerenveen
- 1963–1964: Le Havre AC
- 1964–1965: DOS Utrecht
- * Club domestic league appearances and goals as of 9 June 2007 ‡ National team caps and goals as of 9 June 2007

Arie de Vroet (Dutch pronunciation: [ˈaːri də ˈvrut]; 9 November 1918 – 9 September 1999) was a Dutch footballer who was active as a left winger. De Vroet made his debut at Feijenoord and also played for Le Havre AC and FC Rouen. He also represented the Netherlands at the 1948 Summer Olympics.

== Honours ==
- 1940-41 : Eredivisie winner with Feijenoord
