= Bernard de Wit =

Dutch theoretical physicist (born 1945)

- Education: Utrecht University
- Known for: supergravity
- Awards: Humboldt Prize (1998); ERC Advanced Grant (2010)
- Scientific career
- Fields: Theoretical physics
- Workplaces: Utrecht University
- Thesis: Field-theoretical approach to symmetry aspects of the weak and electromagnetic interactions (1973)
- Doctoral advisor: Martinus Veltman
- Doctoral students: Jan de Boer, Erik Verlinde

Bernard Quirinus Petrus Joseph de Wit (born 1945 in Bergen op Zoom) is a Dutch theoretical physicist specializing in supergravity and particle physics.

Bernard de Wit studied theoretical physics at Utrecht University, where he got his PhD under supervision of Nobel Prize laureate Martinus Veltman in 1973. After postdoc stints in Stony Brook, Utrecht and Leiden, he became a staff member at National Institute for Nuclear and High Energy Physics (NIKHEF) in 1978, where became head of the theory group in 1981. In 1984 he became professor of theoretical physics at Utrecht University where he has stayed for the rest of his career. During the years, de Wit spent several periods at CERN as a visiting scientist in the Theory Division. He officially retired in 2010, but continues to engage in research.
