= Erik Verlinde =

Dutch theoretical physicist

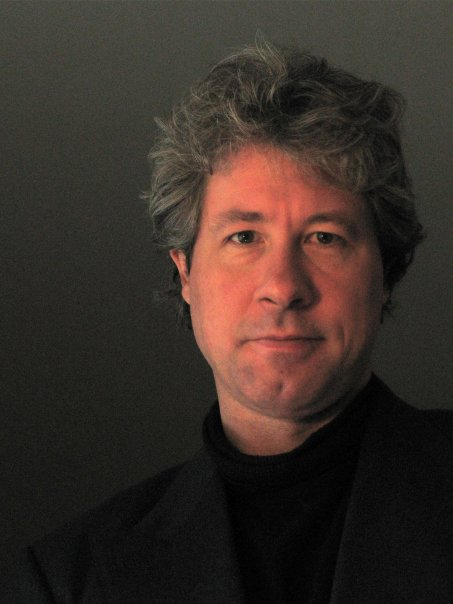
- Erik Verlinde in 2009
- Born: Erik Peter Verlinde; 21 January 1962 (age 64); Woudenberg, Netherlands
- Education: Utrecht University
- Known for: Verlinde algebra Matrix string theory Entropic gravity Emergent gravity
- Awards: Spinoza Prize (2011)
- Scientific career
- Fields: Theoretical physics
- Workplaces: Princeton University; University of Amsterdam
- Thesis: Conformal field theory and its application to strings (1988)
- Doctoral advisor: Bernard de Wit
- Doctoral students: Miranda Cheng

Erik Peter Verlinde (Dutch: [ˈeːrɪk ˈpeːtər vərˈlɪndə]; born 21 January 1962) is a Dutch theoretical physicist and string theorist. He is the identical twin brother of physicist Herman Verlinde. The Verlinde formula, which is important in conformal field theory and topological field theory, is named after him. His research deals with string theory, gravity, black holes and cosmology. Currently, he works at the Institute for Theoretical Physics at the University of Amsterdam.

At a symposium at the Dutch Spinoza-institute on 8 December 2009 he introduced a theory of entropic gravity. In this theory, gravity exists because of a difference in concentration of information in the empty space between two masses and its surroundings; he also extrapolates this to general relativity and quantum mechanics. He said in an interview with the newspaper de Volkskrant, "On the smallest level Newton's laws don't apply, but they do for apples and planets. You can compare this to the pressure of a gas. Molecules themselves don't have any pressure, but a barrel of gas has." It appears that Verlinde's approach to explaining gravity leads naturally to the correct observed strength of dark energy.

== Biography ==
Erik Verlinde was born in the Dutch village of Woudenberg on 21 January 1962, together with his identical twin brother, Herman Verlinde. He went to school in the nearby city of Utrecht, where he graduated from the gymnasium in 1980.

That fall he began his studies in theoretical physics together with his brother at Utrecht University. There he studied with his brother Herman, Robbert Dijkgraaf, and Kareljan Schoutens. He wrote his Master's thesis with Nobel laureate Gerard 't Hooft.

In 1985, Verlinde started work on his PhD at Utrecht University under the formal supervision of Bernard de Wit. He worked again with Herman and Dijkgraaf, and in practice the trio supervised themselves. The original arrangement was that only one of them would be working on the emerging field of string theory, but in the end all three of them wrote their theses on the subject. In September 1988 Erik defended his PhD thesis, which included the Verlinde formula.

After his PhD, Verlinde joined the Institute for Advanced Study in Princeton as a postdoctoral fellow. In 1993, he was added to the permanent staff of the theory division of CERN in Geneva. At the age of 34 he was appointed full professor of theoretical physics at Utrecht University. Only a few years later, in 1999, he left for Princeton University to take up a professorial position there. In 2003, he returned to the Netherlands to become a professor in the string theory group led by Robbert Dijkgraaf at the University of Amsterdam.

== Major contributions ==
Verlinde's main field of research is string theory. Over the years, he has introduced a number of results that have become important in the development of the theory, and in the study of pure mathematics.

=== Verlinde formula ===
Verlinde's PhD thesis was titled "Conformal Field Theory Applied to Strings". In it he investigated conformal field theories in two dimensions and their relation to the description of the world sheet of fundamental strings. As part of the project he extended fusion or Verlinde algebras, describing conformal field theories with a finite number of fields. A main result was an explicit formula for the fusion rules of these algebras, now known as the Verlinde formula. This has proven to be a highly non-trivial mathematical result. In Verlinde's original work, the formula followed from mainly physical arguments, but since its introduction many formal mathematical proofs have been provided.

=== Cardy formula extensions ===
The Cardy formula is an important result in conformal field theory that allows the calculation of the entropy of a 1+1 dimensional conformal field theory. Using the AdS/CFT correspondence between conformal field theories and quantum gravity in anti-de Sitter spaces with one additional dimension, it can be used to calculate (the quantum corrections to) the entropy of black holes in 2+1 dimensions. In 2000, Verlinde extended Cardy's result to conformal field theories of arbitrary dimension, allowing the calculation of entropy of black holes in any dimension.

=== Entropic gravity ===
In 2009, Verlinde showed that the laws of gravity may be derived by assuming a form of the holographic principle and the laws of thermodynamics. This may imply that gravity is not a true fundamental force of nature (like e.g. electromagnetism), but instead is a consequence of the universe striving to maximize entropy.

=== Emergent gravity and the dark universe ===
On 8 November 2016 Erik Verlinde published his new theory of gravity, where gravity is not one of the four fundamental forces of physics but, rather, gravity is emergent from other fundamental forces. In this work, he argues that unlike in anti-de Sitter (AdS) space, holography and the area law do not apply exactly in de Sitter space (which models our universe) because there is an additional entropy associated with the cosmological horizon. If this entropy were evenly distributed throughout space, it would contribute a volume law term to the entropy which becomes dominant at large length scales and is related to dark energy. He further argues that this entropy modifies emergent gravity, introducing residual forces when the acceleration due to gravity is very weak. The result provides a candidate explanation for dark matter similar to the Modified Newtonian Dynamics (MOND) proposal and explains the empirical relationship between dark matter and the Hubble constant. By 1 August 2018 the paper has been quoted in 153 physics papers, including by well-known physicists such as Lee Smolin, and Mordehai Milgrom - originator of MOND. Explanation of modified gravity through entropic gravity is a "quantum gravity theory" merging "general theory of relativity" with "quantum field theory". Verlinde himself names it also quantum information theory.

There are already critical papers on "emergent gravity" such as "Inconsistencies in Verlinde's emergent gravity" by D Dai, D Stojkovic (Springer HEP, Nov 2017), stating that "...When properly done, Verlinde's elaborate procedure recovers the standard Newtonian gravity instead of MOND".

== Awards and honors ==
In June 2011, the Netherlands Organisation for Scientific Research (NWO) awarded Verlinde the Spinoza Prize, the highest award available to Dutch scientists including a 2.5 million euro grant for future research. The committee cited his work on the Verlinde formula, the Witten–Dijkgraaf–Verlinde–Verlinde equations, the Cardy-Verlinde formula and entropic gravity as the major achievements leading to the award.
