= Novikov ring =

Mathematical construct

In mathematics, given an additive subgroup $\Gamma \subset \R$, the Novikov ring $\operatorname{Nov}(\Gamma)$ of $\Gamma$ is the subring of $\Z[\![\Gamma]\!]$ consisting of formal sums $\sum n_{\gamma_i} t^{\gamma_i}$ such that $\gamma_1 > \gamma_2 > \cdots$ and $\gamma_i \to -\infty$. The notion was introduced by Sergei Novikov in the papers that initiated the generalization of Morse theory using a closed one-form instead of a function. The notion is used in quantum cohomology, among the others.

The Novikov ring $\operatorname{Nov}(\Gamma)$ is a principal ideal domain. Let S be the subset of $\Z[\Gamma]$ consisting of those with leading term 1. Since the elements of S are unit elements of $\operatorname{Nov}(\Gamma)$, the localization $\operatorname{Nov}(\Gamma)[S^{-1}]$ of $\operatorname{Nov}(\Gamma)$ with respect to S is a subring of $\operatorname{Nov}(\Gamma)$ called the "rational part" of $\operatorname{Nov}(\Gamma)$; it is also a principal ideal domain.

== Novikov numbers ==
Given a smooth function f on a smooth manifold $M$ with nondegenerate critical points, the usual Morse theory constructs a free chain complex $C_*(f)$ such that the (integral) rank of $C_p$ is the number of critical points of f of index p (called the Morse number). It computes the (integral) homology of $M$ (cf. Morse homology):

$$H^*(C_*(f)) \cong H^*(M,\Z)$$

In an analogy with this, one can define "Novikov numbers". Let X be a connected polyhedron with a base point. Each cohomology class $\xi \in H^1(X,\R)$ may be viewed as a linear functional on the first homology group $H_1(X,\R)$; when composed with the Hurewicz homomorphism, it can be viewed as a group homomorphism $\xi\colon \pi=\pi_1(X) \to \R$. By the universal property, this map in turns gives a ring homomorphism,

$$\phi_\xi\colon \Z[\pi] \to \operatorname{Nov} = \operatorname{Nov}(\R)$$,

making $\operatorname{Nov}$ a module over $\Z[\pi]$. Since X is a connected polyhedron, a local coefficient system over it corresponds one-to-one to a $\Z[\pi]$-module. Let $L_\xi$ be a local coefficient system corresponding to $\operatorname{Nov}$ with module structure given by $\phi_\xi$. The homology group $H_p(X, L_\xi)$ is a finitely generated module over $\operatorname{Nov},$ which is, by the structure theorem, the direct sum of its free part and its torsion part. The rank of the free part is called the Novikov Betti number and is denoted by $b_p(\xi)$. The number of cyclic modules in the torsion part is denoted by $q_p(\xi)$. If $\xi = 0$, $L_\xi$ is trivial and $b_p(0)$ is the usual Betti number of X.

The analog of Morse inequalities holds for Novikov numbers as well (cf. the reference for now.)
