= Alexei Zamolodchikov =

Russian physicist

- Born: 18 September 1952; Novo-Ivankovo, Soviet Union
- Died: 18 October 2007 (aged 55); Moscow, Russia
- Education: Moscow Institute of Physics and Technology
- Scientific career
- Fields: quantum field theory, quantum gravity, string theory

Alexei Borisovich Zamolodchikov (Russian: Алексей Борисович Замолодчиков; 18 September 1952 – 18 October 2007) was a Russian physicist known for his contributions to quantum field theory, quantum gravity and the Liouville string theory. Today, the application of this technique is a standard way of analyzing 2D quantum field theories beyond perturbation theory.

He was the twin brother of well-known physicist Alexander Zamolodchikov. Born in Novo-Ivankovo (now Dubna), they both earned a B.Sc. in nuclear engineering (1969–76) from Moscow Institute of Physics and Technology. They each earned a Ph.D. in physics from the Institute for Theoretical and Experimental Physics, Alexei with a thesis titled Factorized scattering in asymptotically free two-dimensional models of quantum field theory (1979).

He then worked for Scientific Council on Cybernetics, Academy of Sciences of USSR, Moscow (1984–87), rejoined as senior researcher, the Institute for Theoretical and Experimental Physics (1987–). He visited Laboratoire de Physique Statistique, Ecole Normale (1990) before taking a senior CNRS position at University of Montpellier II (1991–2007). His last year he was with the Independent University of Moscow. He died in Moscow. The Liouville field theory and stochastic models seminar was held in his honor in 2008.

== See also ==
- Zamolodchikov's recursive representation
