= Miranda Cheng =

Taiwanese-born Dutch-educated mathematician and physicist (born 1979)

Miranda Chih-Ning Cheng (Chinese: 程之寧; born 6 June 1979, Taipei) is a Taiwanese mathematician and theoretical physicist who works as an associate professor at the University of Amsterdam. She is known for formulating the umbral moonshine conjectures and for her work on the connections between K3 surfaces and string theory.

== Early life ==
Cheng was born in 1979 in Taipei, Taiwan, where she first became interested in literature and music, and was particularly interested in pop music, rock, and punk. School was relatively easy for Cheng as she went on to skip two years and got moved to a special class. Unfortunately, the competitiveness and stress that came from school caused her to drop out and leave her parents' home to work at a record store and play in a punk rock band at the age of 16. Despite not completing high school, Cheng was still able to attend university through a program for gifted science students.

== Education ==
After graduating from the Department of Physics at National Taiwan University in 2001, Cheng moved to the Netherlands to continue her studies where she earned a master's degree in theoretical physics in 2003 from Utrecht University, under the supervision of Nobel laureate Gerard 't Hooft. She completed her Ph.D. in 2008 from the University of Amsterdam under the joint supervision of Erik Verlinde and Kostas Skenderis. After postdoctoral study at Harvard University and working as a researcher at CNRS, she returned to Amsterdam in 2014, with a joint position in the Institute of Physics and Korteweg-de Vries Institute for Mathematics.

== Work with the Umbral Moonshine Conjecture ==
Cheng, along with John Duncan of Case Western Reserve University and Jeffrey Harvey of the University of Chicago, formulated the Umbral Moonshine Conjecture in 2012, providing evidence of 23 new moonshines. They postulated that for each of these moonshines, there is a string theory, in which the string states are counted by the mock modular forms and the finite group captures the model's symmetry. In reference to the string theory underlying umbral moonshine, Cheng said that “it suggests that there’s a special symmetry acting on the physical theory of K3 surfaces.”
