= Conformal family =

Irreducible representation of the Virasoro algebra

In theoretical physics, a conformal family is an irreducible representation of the Virasoro algebra. In most cases, it is uniquely determined by its primary field or the highest weight vector. The family contains all of its descendant fields.

== See also ==
- Conformal field theory
