= Quantum cohomology =

Concept in algebraic geometry

In mathematics, specifically in symplectic topology and algebraic geometry, a quantum cohomology ring is an extension of the ordinary cohomology ring of a closed symplectic manifold. It comes in two versions, called small and big; in general, the latter is more complicated and contains more information than the former. In each, the choice of coefficient ring (typically a Novikov ring, described below) significantly affects its structure, as well.

While the cup product of ordinary cohomology describes how submanifolds of the manifold intersect each other, the quantum cup product of quantum cohomology describes how subspaces intersect in a "fuzzy", "quantum" way. More precisely, they intersect if they are connected via one or more pseudoholomorphic curves. Gromov–Witten invariants, which count these curves, appear as coefficients in expansions of the quantum cup product.

Because it expresses a structure or pattern for Gromov–Witten invariants, quantum cohomology has important implications for enumerative geometry. It also connects to many ideas in mathematical physics and mirror symmetry. In particular, it is ring-isomorphic to symplectic Floer homology.

Throughout this article, X is a closed symplectic manifold with symplectic form ω.

== Novikov ring ==
Various choices of coefficient ring for the quantum cohomology of X are possible. Usually a ring is chosen that encodes information about the second homology of X. This allows the quantum cup product, defined below, to record information about pseudoholomorphic curves in X. For example, let

$$H_2(X) = H_2(X, \mathbf{Z}) / \mathrm{torsion}$$

be the second homology modulo its torsion. Let R be any commutative ring with unit and Λ the ring of formal power series of the form

$$\lambda = \sum_{A \in H_2(X)} \lambda_A e^A,$$

where

- the coefficients $\lambda_A$ come from R,
- the $e^A$ are formal variables subject to the relation $e^A e^B = e^{A + B}$,
- for every real number C, only finitely many A with ω(A) less than or equal to C have nonzero coefficients $\lambda_A$.

The variable $e^A$ is considered to be of degree $2\int_A c_1(TX)$, where $c_1$ is the first Chern class of the tangent bundle TX, regarded as a complex vector bundle by choosing any almost complex structure compatible with ω. Thus Λ is a graded ring, called the Novikov ring for ω. (Alternative definitions are common.)

== Small quantum cohomology ==
Let

$$H^*(X) = H^*(X, \mathbf{Z}) / \mathrm{torsion}$$

be the cohomology of X modulo torsion. Define the small quantum cohomology with coefficients in Λ to be

$$QH^*(X, \Lambda) = H^*(X) \otimes_\mathbf{Z} \Lambda.$$

Its elements are finite sums of the form

$$\sum_i a_i \otimes \lambda_i.$$

The small quantum cohomology is a graded R-module with

$$\deg(a_i \otimes \lambda_i) = \deg(a_i) + \deg(\lambda_i).$$

The ordinary cohomology H*(X) embeds into QH*(X, Λ) via $a \mapsto a \otimes 1$, and QH*(X, Λ) is generated as a Λ-module by H*(X).

For any two cohomology classes a, b in H*(X) of pure degree, and for any A in $H_2(X)$, define (a∗b)_{A} to be the unique element of H*(X) such that

$$\int_X (a * b)_A \smile c = GW_{0, 3}^{X, A}(a, b, c).$$

(The right-hand side is a genus-0, 3-point Gromov–Witten invariant.) Then define

$$a * b := \sum_{A \in H_2(X)} (a * b)_A \otimes e^A.$$

This extends by linearity to a well-defined Λ-bilinear map

$$QH^*(X, \Lambda) \otimes QH^*(X, \Lambda) \to QH^*(X, \Lambda)$$

called the small quantum cup product.

== Geometric interpretation ==
The only pseudoholomorphic curves in class A = 0 are constant maps, whose images are points. It follows that

$$GW_{0, 3}^{X, 0}(a, b, c) = \int_X a \smile b \smile c;$$

in other words,

$$(a * b)_0 = a \smile b.$$

Thus the quantum cup product contains the ordinary cup product; it extends the ordinary cup product to nonzero classes A.

In general, the Poincaré dual of (a∗b)_{A} corresponds to the space of pseudoholomorphic curves of class A passing through the Poincaré duals of a and b. So while the ordinary cohomology considers a and b to intersect only when they meet at one or more points, the quantum cohomology records a nonzero intersection for a and b whenever they are connected by one or more pseudoholomorphic curves. The Novikov ring just provides a bookkeeping system large enough to record this intersection information for all classes A.

== Example ==
Let X be the complex projective plane with its standard symplectic form (corresponding to the Fubini–Study metric) and complex structure. Let $\ell \in H^2(X)$ be the Poincaré dual of a line L. Then

$$H^*(X) \cong \mathbf{Z}[\ell] / \ell^3.$$

The only nonzero Gromov–Witten invariants are those of class A = 0 or A = L. It turns out that

$$\int_X (\ell^i * \ell^j)_0 \smile \ell^k = GW_{0, 3}^{X, 0}(\ell^i, \ell^j, \ell^k) = \delta(i + j + k,2)$$

and

$$\int_X (\ell^i * \ell^j)_L \smile \ell^k = GW_{0, 3}^{X, L}(\ell^i, \ell^j, \ell^k) = \delta(i + j + k, 5),$$

where δ is the Kronecker delta. Therefore,

$$\ell * \ell = \ell^2 e^0 + 0 e^L = \ell^2,$$

$$\ell * \ell^2 = 0 e^0 + 1 e^L = e^L.$$

In this case it is convenient to rename $e^L$ as q and use the simpler coefficient ring Z[q]. This q is of degree $6 = 2 c_1(L)$. Then

$$QH^*(X, \mathbf{Z}[q]) \cong \mathbf{Z}[\ell, q] / (\ell^3 = q).$$

== Properties of the small quantum cup product ==
For a, b of pure degree,

$$\deg (a * b) = \deg (a) + \deg (b)$$

and

$$b * a = (-1)^{\deg (a) \deg (b)} a * b.$$

The small quantum cup product is distributive and Λ-bilinear. The identity element $1 \in H^0(X)$ is also the identity element for small quantum cohomology.

The small quantum cup product is also associative. This is a consequence of the gluing law for Gromov–Witten invariants, a difficult technical result. It is tantamount to the fact that the Gromov–Witten potential (a generating function for the genus-0 Gromov–Witten invariants) satisfies a certain third-order differential equation known as the WDVV equation.

An intersection pairing

$$QH^*(X, \Lambda) \otimes QH^*(X, \Lambda) \to R$$

is defined by

$$\left\langle \sum_i a_i \otimes \lambda_i, \sum_j b_j \otimes \mu_j \right\rangle = \sum_{i, j} (\lambda_i)_0 (\mu_j)_0 \int_X a_i \smile b_j.$$

(The subscripts 0 indicate the A = 0 coefficient.) This pairing satisfies the associativity property

$$\langle a * b, c \rangle = \langle a, b * c \rangle.$$

== Dubrovin connection ==
When the base ring R is C, one can view the evenly graded part H of the vector space QH*(X, Λ) as a complex manifold. The small quantum cup product restricts to a well-defined, commutative product on H. Under mild assumptions, H with the intersection pairing $\langle, \rangle$ is then a Frobenius algebra.

The quantum cup product can be viewed as a connection on the tangent bundle TH, called the Dubrovin connection. Commutativity and associativity of the quantum cup product then correspond to zero-torsion and zero-curvature conditions on this connection.

== Big quantum cohomology ==
There exists a neighborhood U of 0 ∈ H such that $\langle , \rangle$ and the Dubrovin connection give U the structure of a Frobenius manifold. Any a in U defines a quantum cup product

$$*_a : H \otimes H \to H$$

by the formula

$$\langle x *_a y, z \rangle := \sum_n \sum_A \frac{1}{n!} GW_{0, n + 3}^{X, A}(x, y, z, a, \ldots, a).$$

Collectively, these products on H are called the big quantum cohomology. All of the genus-0 Gromov–Witten invariants are recoverable from it; in general, the same is not true of the simpler small quantum cohomology.

Small quantum cohomology has only information of 3-point Gromov–Witten invariants, but the big quantum cohomology has of all (n ≧ 4) n-point Gromov–Witten invariants. To obtain enumerative geometrical information for some manifolds, we need to use big quantum cohomology. Small quantum cohomology would correspond to 3-point correlation functions in physics while big quantum cohomology would correspond to all of n-point correlation functions.
