= Virasoro conformal block =

Special functions used to build correlation functions in 2D CFTs

In two-dimensional conformal field theory, Virasoro conformal blocks (named after Miguel Ángel Virasoro) are special functions that serve as building blocks of correlation functions. On a given punctured Riemann surface, Virasoro conformal blocks form a particular basis of the space of solutions of the conformal Ward identities. Zero-point blocks on the torus are characters of representations of the Virasoro algebra; four-point blocks on the sphere reduce to hypergeometric functions in special cases, but are in general much more complicated. In two dimensions as in other dimensions, conformal blocks play an essential role in the conformal bootstrap approach to conformal field theory.

== Definition ==
=== Definition from OPEs ===
Using operator product expansions (OPEs), an $N$-point function on the sphere can be written as a combination of three-point structure constants, and universal quantities called $N$-point conformal blocks.

Given an $N$-point function, there are several types of conformal blocks, depending on which OPEs are used. In the case $N=4$, there are three types of conformal blocks, corresponding to three possible decompositions of the same four-point function. Schematically, these decompositions read

$$\left\langle V_1V_2V_3V_4\right\rangle
=\sum_s C_{12s}C_{s34}\mathcal{F}^{\text{(s-channel)}}_s = \sum_t C_{14t}C_{t23}\mathcal{F}^{\text{(t-channel)}}_t = \sum_u C_{13u}C_{24u}\mathcal{F}^{\text{(u-channel)}}_u\ ,$$

where $C$ are structure constants and $\mathcal{F}$ are conformal blocks. The sums are over representations of the conformal algebra that appear in the CFT's spectrum. OPEs involve sums over the spectrum, i.e. over representations and over states in representations, but the sums over states are absorbed in the conformal blocks.

In two dimensions, the symmetry algebra factorizes into two copies of the Virasoro algebra, called left-moving and right-moving. If the fields are factorized too, then the conformal blocks factorize as well, and the factors are called Virasoro conformal blocks. Left-moving Virasoro conformal blocks are locally holomorphic functions of the fields' positions $z_i$; right-moving Virasoro conformal blocks are the same functions of $\bar z_i$. The factorization of a conformal block into Virasoro conformal blocks is of the type

$$\mathcal{F}^{\text{(s-channel)}}_{s_L\otimes s_R}(\{z_i\}) = \mathcal{F}^{\text{(s-channel, Virasoro)}}_{s_L}(\{z_i\})\mathcal{F}^{\text{(s-channel, Virasoro)}}_{s_R}(\{\bar z_i\})\ ,$$

where $s_L,s_R$ are representations of the left- and right-moving Virasoro algebras respectively.

=== Definition from Virasoro Ward identities ===
Conformal Ward identities are the linear equations that correlation functions obey, as a result of conformal symmetry.

In two dimensions, conformal Ward identities decompose into left-moving and right-moving Virasoro Ward identities. Virasoro conformal blocks are solutions of the Virasoro Ward identities.

OPEs define specific bases of Virasoro conformal blocks, such as the s-channel basis in the case of four-point blocks. The blocks that are defined from OPEs are special cases of the blocks that are defined from Ward identities.

== Properties ==
Any linear holomorphic equation that is obeyed by a correlation function, must also hold for the corresponding conformal blocks. In addition, specific bases of conformal blocks come with extra properties that are not inherited from the correlation function.

Conformal blocks that involve only primary fields have relatively simple properties. Conformal blocks that involve descendant fields can then be deduced using local Ward identities. An s-channel four-point block of primary fields depends on the four fields' conformal dimensions $\Delta_i,$ on their positions $z_i,$ and on the s-channel conformal dimension $\Delta_s$. It can be written as $\mathcal{F}^{(s)}_{\Delta_s}(\Delta_i|\{z_i\}),$ where the dependence on the Virasoro algebra's central charge is kept implicit.

=== Conformal covariance ===
In an $N$-point block on the sphere, Ward identities for global conformal symmetry reduce the dependence on the $N$ field positions to a dependence on $N-3$ cross-ratios. In the case $N=4,$

$$\mathcal{F}^{(s)}_{\Delta_s}(\{\Delta_i\}|\{z_i\})= z_{23}^{\Delta_1-\Delta_2-\Delta_3+\Delta_4} z_{13}^{-2\Delta_1} z_{34}^{\Delta_1+\Delta_2-\Delta_3-\Delta_4} z_{24}^{-\Delta_1-\Delta_2+\Delta_3-\Delta_4}\mathcal{F}^{(s)}_{\Delta_s} (\{\Delta_i \}|z),$$

where $z_{ij}=z_i-z_j,$ and

$$z= \frac{z_{12}z_{34}}{z_{13}z_{24}}$$

is the cross-ratio, and the reduced block $\mathcal{F}^{(s)}_{\Delta_s}(\{\Delta_i\}|z)$ coincides with the original block where three positions are sent to $(0,\infty, 1),$

$$\mathcal{F}^{(s)}_{\Delta_s}(\{\Delta_i\}|z)= \mathcal{F}^{(s)}_{\Delta_s}(\{\Delta_i\}|z,0,\infty,1).$$

=== Singularities in the fields' positions ===
Like correlation functions, conformal blocks are singular when two fields coincide. Unlike correlation functions, conformal blocks have very simple behaviours at some of these singularities. As a consequence of their definition from OPEs, s-channel four-point blocks obey

$$\mathcal{F}^{(s)}_{\Delta_s}(\{\Delta_i\}|z) \underset{z\to 0}{=} z^{\Delta_s-\Delta_1-\Delta_2}\left\{1 + \sum_{N=1}^\infty c_N z^N\right\}\ ,$$

for some coefficients $c_N$. On the other hand, s-channel blocks have complicated singular behaviours at $z=1,\infty$: it is t-channel blocks that are simple at $z=1$, and u-channel blocks that are simple at $z=\infty.$

In a four-point block that obeys a BPZ differential equation, $z=0,1,\infty$ are regular singular points of the differential equation, and $\Delta_s-\Delta_1-\Delta_2$ is a characteristic exponent of the differential equation. For a differential equation of order $n$, the $n$ characteristic exponents correspond to the $n$ values of $\Delta_s$ that are allowed by the fusion rules.

=== Field permutations ===
Permutations of the fields $V_i(z_i)$ leave the correlation function

$$\left\langle\prod_{i=1}^NV_i(z_i)\right\rangle$$

invariant, and therefore relate different bases of conformal blocks with one another. In the case of four-point blocks, t-channel blocks are related to s-channel blocks by

$$\mathcal{F}^{(t)}_{\Delta}(\Delta_1,\Delta_2,\Delta_3,\Delta_4|z_1,z_2,z_3,z_4) = \mathcal{F}^{(s)}_{\Delta}(\Delta_1, \Delta_4, \Delta_3,\Delta_2|z_1,z_4,z_3,z_2),$$

or equivalently

$$\mathcal{F}^{(t)}_{\Delta}(\Delta_1,\Delta_2,\Delta_3,\Delta_4|z) = \mathcal{F}^{(s)}_{\Delta} (\Delta_1, \Delta_4, \Delta_3, \Delta_2| 1-z).$$

=== Fusing matrix ===
The change of bases from s-channel to t-channel four-point blocks is characterized by the fusing matrix (or fusion kernel) $F$, such that

$$\mathcal{F}^{(s)}_{\Delta_s}(\{\Delta_i\}|\{z_i\})
= \int_{i\mathbb{R}} dP_t\ F_{\Delta_s,\Delta_t}\begin{bmatrix} \Delta_2 & \Delta_3 \\ \Delta_1 & \Delta_4 \end{bmatrix} \mathcal{F}^{(t)}_{\Delta_t}(\{\Delta_i\}|\{z_i\}).$$

The fusing matrix is a function of the central charge and conformal dimensions, but it does not depend on the positions $z_i.$ The momentum $P_t$ is defined in terms of the dimension $\Delta_t$ by

$$\Delta = \frac{c-1}{24}-P^2.$$

The values $P\in i\mathbb{R}$ correspond to the spectrum of Liouville theory. In $N$-point blocks on the sphere, the change of bases between two sets of blocks that are defined from different sequences of OPEs can always be written in terms of the fusing matrix, and a simple matrix that describes the permutation of the first two fields in an s-channel block,

$$\mathcal{F}^{(s)}_{\Delta_s}(\Delta_1,\Delta_2,\Delta_3,\Delta_4|z_1,z_2,z_3,z_4) = e^{i\pi(\Delta_s-\Delta_1-\Delta_2)} \mathcal{F}^{(s)}_{\Delta_s}(\Delta_2,\Delta_1,\Delta_3,\Delta_4|z_2,z_1,z_3,z_4).$$

The expression of the fusing matrix depends on the value of the central charge $c$, equivalently on the parameter $b$ defined by

$$c= 1+6Q^2, \qquad Q=b+b^{-1}.$$

The special case $c\leq 1$ gives rise to different expressions depending on $b^2\in\mathbb{Q}$ or $b^2\in \mathbb{R}_{<0}\backslash\mathbb{Q}_{<0}$. In the general case $c\in \mathbb{C}\backslash (-\infty, 1]$ with $P_i\in i\R$, the fusing matrix is

$$\begin{align}
F_{\Delta_s,\Delta_t} &\begin{bmatrix} \Delta_2 & \Delta_3 \\ \Delta_1 & \Delta_4 \end{bmatrix} = \\
&= \left(\prod_{\pm}\frac{\Gamma_b(Q\pm 2P_s)}{\Gamma_b(\pm 2P_t)}\right) \frac{\Xi_+(P_1,P_4,P_t)\Xi_+(P_2,P_3,P_t)}{\Xi_-(P_1,P_2,P_s)\Xi_-(P_3,P_4,P_s)} \times
\\
&\quad \times \int_{\frac{Q}{4}+i\R}du \ S_b \left (u-P_{12s} \right ) S_b \left (u-P_{s34} \right ) S_b \left (u-P_{23t} \right )S_b \left (u-P_{t14} \right )
\\
& \qquad \times
S_b \left ( \tfrac{Q}{2}-u+P_{1234} \right ) S_b \left (\tfrac{Q}{2}-u+P_{st13} \right ) S_b \left(\tfrac{Q}{2}-u+P_{st24} \right)S_b \left(\tfrac{Q}{2}-u \right )
\end{align}$$

where $\Gamma_b$ is a double gamma function,

$$\begin{align}
S_b(x)  &= \frac{\Gamma_b(x)}{\Gamma_b(Q-x)} \\[6pt]
\Xi_\epsilon(P_1,P_2,P_3) &=\prod_{\underset{\epsilon_1\epsilon_2\epsilon_3=\epsilon}{\epsilon_1,\epsilon_2,\epsilon_3=\pm }} \Gamma_b\left(\tfrac{Q}{2}+\sum_i\epsilon_iP_i\right) \\[6pt]
P_{ijk} &= P_i+P_j+P_k
\end{align}$$

Although its expression is simpler in terms of momentums $P_i$ than in terms of conformal dimensions $\Delta_i$, the fusing matrix is really a function of $\Delta_i$, i.e. a function of $P_i$ that is invariant under $P_i\to -P_i$. In the expression for the fusing matrix, the integral is a hyperbolic Barnes integral. Up to normalization, the fusing matrix coincides with Ruijsenaars' hypergeometric function, with the arguments $P_s,P_t$ and parameters $b,b^{-1},P_1,P_2,P_3,P_4$. The fusing matrix has several different integral representations, and obeys many nontrivial identities.

=== Exponentiation at large central charge ===
In the large central charge limit with fixed ratios $\tfrac{\Delta_i}{c}$ (including for channel dimensions), the logarithm of a conformal block is linear in $c$. In the case of a sphere 4-point block, this means

$$\log \mathcal{F}^{(s)}_{\Delta_s}(\{\Delta_1,\Delta_2,\Delta_3,\Delta_4\}|z)\ \underset{c\to \infty}{=} \ c\cdot f^{(s)}_{\frac{\Delta_s}{c}}\left(\left\{\tfrac{\Delta_1}{c},\tfrac{\Delta_2}{c},\tfrac{\Delta_3}{c},\tfrac{\Delta_4}{c}\right\}\Big|z\right) + O(1)$$

This property underlies Zamolodchikov's recursive representation.

=== Triality of sphere 4-point blocks ===
Up to simple prefactors of the type $z^\alpha (1-z)^\beta$, 4-point sphere conformal blocks are invariant under

$$(P_1,P_2,P_3,P_4) \to \frac12(P_1+P_2+P_3+P_4,P_1+P_2-P_3-P_4,P_1-P_2+P_3-P_4,P_1-P_2-P_3+P_4)$$

== Computation of conformal blocks ==
Software for numerically computing Virasoro blocks include a Julia package, and a Python program geared towards deriving bounds on unitary CFTs.

=== From the definition ===
The definition from OPEs leads to an expression for an s-channel four-point conformal block as a sum over states in the s-channel representation, of the type

$$\mathcal{F}^{\text{(s)}}_{\Delta_s}(\{\Delta_i\}|z)= z^{\Delta_s-\Delta_1-\Delta_2} \left\{1+\sum_{N=1}^\infty c_N z^N\right\} \quad \text{with} \quad c_N =
\sum_{|L|=|L'|=N} f_{12s}^L Q_{L,L'}^s f_{43s}^{L'}\ .$$

The sum is over creation modes $L,L'$ of the Virasoro algebra, i.e. combinations of the type $L=\prod_i L_{-n_i}$ of Virasoro generators with $1\leq n_1\leq n_2\leq \cdots$, whose level is $|L|=\sum n_i$. Such generators correspond to basis states in the Verma module with the conformal dimension $\Delta_s$. The coefficient $f_{12s}^L$ is a function of $\Delta_1,\Delta_2,\Delta_s,L$, which is known explicitly. The quantity $Q_{L,L'}^s$ is a matrix element of the inverse Shapovalov form: it is a function of $c,\Delta_s,L,L'$ which vanishes if $|L|\neq |L'|$, and diverges for $|L|=N$ if there is a null vector at level $N$. The first nontrivial coefficient is

$$c_1=\frac{(\Delta_s+\Delta_1-\Delta_2)(\Delta_s+\Delta_4-\Delta_3)}{2\Delta_s}\ .$$

(In particular, $Q_{L_{-1},L_{-1}}^s=\frac{1}{2\Delta_s}$ does not depend on the central charge $c$.) An explicit expression for $c_N$ is known.

=== Zamolodchikov's recursive representation ===
In Alexei Zamolodchikov's recursive representation of four-point blocks on the sphere, the cross-ratio $z$ appears via the nome

$$q = \exp -\pi \frac{F(\frac12,\frac12,1,1-z)}{F(\frac12,\frac12,1,z)} \underset{z\to 0}{=} \frac{z}{16}+\frac{z^2}{32}+O(z^3)  \quad \iff \quad z = \frac{\theta_2(q)^4}{\theta_3(q)^4} \underset{q\to 0}{=} 16 q - 128 q^2 + O(q^3)$$

where $F$ is the hypergeometric function, and we introduce the Jacobi theta functions

$$\theta_2(q) =  2q^\frac14\sum_{n=0}^\infty q^{n(n+1)} \quad , \quad \theta_3(q) = \sum_{n\in{\mathbb{Z}}} q^{n^2}\quad , \quad \theta_4(q) = \sum_{n=-\infty}^\infty (-1)^n q^{n^2}$$

The representation is of the type

$$\mathcal{F}^{(s)}_{\Delta}(\{\Delta_i\}|z) = (16q)^{\Delta -\frac{Q^2}{4}} \left[\prod_{k=2,3,4}\left(\theta_k(q)^{-4}\right)^{\Delta_k-\frac{Q^2}{4}+(-1)^k\Delta_1}\right] H_{\Delta}(\{\Delta_i\}|q)\ .$$

The function $H_{\Delta}(\{\Delta_i\}|q)$ is a power series in $q$, which is recursively defined by

$$H_{\Delta}(\{\Delta_i\}|q) = 1 + \sum_{m,n=1}^\infty \frac{(16q)^{mn}}{\Delta-\Delta_{(m,n)}} R_{m,n} H_{\Delta_{(m,-n)}}(\{\Delta_i\}|q)\ .$$

In this formula, the positions $\Delta_{(m,n)}$ of the poles are the dimensions of degenerate representations, which correspond to the momentums

$$P_{(m,n)} = \frac12 \left(mb+nb^{-1}\right)\ .$$

The residues $R_{m,n}$ are given by

$$R_{m,n} = \frac{2P_{( 0,0)} P_{( m,n)}}{\prod_{r=1-m}^m \prod_{s=1-n}^n 2P_{(r,s)}}
\prod_{r\overset{2}{=}1-m}^{m-1} \prod_{s\overset{2}{=}1-n}^{n-1} \prod_\pm (P_2\pm P_1 + P_{( r,s)}) (P_3\pm P_4 +P_{( r,s)})\ ,$$

where the superscript in $\overset{2}{=}$ indicates a product that runs by increments of $2$. The recursion relation for $H_{\Delta}(\{\Delta_i\}|q)$ can be solved, giving rise to an explicit (but impractical) formula.

While the coefficients of the power series $H_{\Delta}(\{\Delta_i\}|q)$ need not be positive in unitary theories, the coefficients of $\prod_{k=1}^\infty (1-q^{2k})^{-\frac12} H_{\Delta}(\{\Delta_i\}|q)$ are positive, due to this combination's interpretation in terms of sums of states in the pillow geometry. And the block's prefactors can be interpreted in terms of the conformal transformation from the sphere to the pillow.

The recursive representation can be seen as an expansion around $\Delta=\infty$. It is sometimes called the $\Delta$-recursion, in order to distinguish it from the $c$-recursion: another recursive representation, also due to Alexei Zamolodchikov, which expands around $c=\infty$, and generates a series in powers of $z$. The $c$-recursion can be generalized to $N$-point Virasoro conformal blocks on arbitrary Riemann surfaces. The $\Delta$-recursion can be generalized to one-point blocks on the torus. In other cases, there are no known generalizations of the $\Delta$-recursion, but there exist modified $c$-recursions that generate series in powers of $z$.

=== From the AGT relation to instanton counting ===
The Alday–Gaiotto–Tachikawa relation between two-dimensional conformal field theory and supersymmetric gauge theory, more specifically, between the conformal blocks of Liouville theory and Nekrasov partition functions of supersymmetric gauge theories in four dimensions, leads to combinatorial expressions for conformal blocks as sums over Young diagrams. Each diagram can be interpreted as a state in a representation of the Virasoro algebra, times an abelian affine Lie algebra.

== Special cases ==
=== Zero-point blocks on the torus ===
A zero-point block does not depend on field positions, but it depends on the moduli of the underlying Riemann surface. In the case of the torus

$$\frac{\Complex}{\Z+\tau\Z},$$

that dependence is better written through $q=e^{2\pi i\tau}$ and the zero-point block associated to a representation $\mathcal{R}$ of the Virasoro algebra is

$$\chi_\mathcal{R}(\tau) = \operatorname{Tr}_\mathcal{R} q^{L_0-\frac{c}{24}},$$

where $L_0$ is a generator of the Virasoro algebra. This coincides with the character of $\mathcal{R}.$ The characters of some highest-weight representations are:

- Verma module with conformal dimension $\Delta=\tfrac{c-1}{24}-P^2$:

$$\chi_P(\tau) = \frac{q^{-P^2}}{\eta(\tau)},$$

where $\eta(\tau)$ is the Dedekind eta function.

- Degenerate representation with the momentum $P_{(r,s)}$:

$$\chi_{(r,s)}(\tau) = \chi_{P_{(r,s)}}(\tau) - \chi_{P_{(r,-s)}}(\tau).$$

- Fully degenerate representation at rational $b^2 = -\tfrac{p}{q}$:

$$\chi_{(r,s)}(\tau) = \sum_{k\in\Z} \left(\chi_{P_{(r,s)}+ik\sqrt{pq}}(\tau) - \chi_{P_{(r,-s)}+ik\sqrt{pq}}(\tau) \right).$$

The characters transform linearly under the modular transformations:

$$\tau \to \frac{a\tau + b}{c\tau +d}, \qquad \begin{pmatrix} a & b \\ c & d \end{pmatrix} \in SL_2(\Z).$$

In particular their transformation under $\tau \to -\tfrac{1}{\tau}$ is described by the modular S-matrix. Using the S-matrix, constraints on a CFT's spectrum can be derived from the modular invariance of the torus partition function, leading in particular to the ADE classification of minimal models. These are related to the modular group representations of modular tensor categories.

=== One-point blocks on the torus ===
An arbitrary one-point block on the torus can be written in terms of a four-point block on the sphere at a different central charge. This relation maps the modulus of the torus to the cross-ratio of the four points' positions, and three of the four fields on the sphere have the fixed momentum $P_{(0,\frac12)} = \tfrac{1}{4b}$:

$$H^\text{torus}_{P'}(P_1|q^2) = H_{P}\left(\left.\tfrac{1}{4b},P_2,\tfrac{1}{4b},\tfrac{1}{4b}\right|q\right)  \quad \text{with}\quad \left\{\begin{array}{l} b=\frac{b'}{\sqrt{2}}\\ P_2=\frac{P_1}{\sqrt{2}}\\ P=\sqrt{2}P' \end{array}\right.$$

where

- $H_{P_s}\left(\left.P_1,P_2,P_3,P_4\right|q\right)$ is the non-trivial factor of the sphere four-point block in Zamolodchikov's recursive representation, written in terms of momentums $P_i$ instead of dimensions $\Delta_i$.
- $H^\text{torus}_{P}(P_1|q)$ is the non-trivial factor of the torus one-point block $\mathcal{F}^\text{torus}_{\Delta}(\Delta_1|q) = q^{\Delta-\frac{c-1}{24}}\eta(q)^{-1}H^\text{torus}_{\Delta}(\Delta_1|q)$, where $\eta(q)$ is the Dedekind eta function, the modular parameter $\tau$ of the torus is such that $q=e^{2\pi i\tau}$, and the field on the torus has the dimension $\Delta_1$.

The recursive representation of one-point blocks on the torus is

$$H^\text{torus}_{\Delta}(\Delta_1|q) = 1 + \sum_{m,n=1}^\infty \frac{q^{mn}}{\Delta-\Delta_{(m,n)}} R^\text{torus}_{m,n} H^\text{torus}_{\Delta_{(m,-n)}}(\Delta_1|q)\ ,$$

where the residues are

$$R^\text{torus}_{m,n} = \frac{2P_{( 0,0)} P_{( m,n)}}{\prod_{r=1-m}^m \prod_{s=1-n}^n 2P_{(r,s)}}
\prod_{r\overset{2}{=}1-2m}^{2m-1} \prod_{s\overset{2}{=}1-2n}^{2n-1} \left(P_1+P_{(r,s)}\right)\ .$$

Under modular transformations, one-point blocks on the torus behave as

$$\mathcal{F}^\text{torus}_{P}\left(P_1|-\tfrac{1}{\tau}\right) = \int_{i\mathbb{R}} dP'\ S_{P,P'}(P_1)\mathcal{F}^\text{torus}_{P'}\left(P_1|\tau\right)\ ,$$

where the modular kernel is

$$S_{P,P'}(P_1) =  \frac{\sqrt{2}}{S_b(\frac{Q}{2}+P_1)}
\prod_\pm \frac{\Gamma_b(Q\pm 2P)}{\Gamma_b(\pm 2P')} \frac{\Gamma_b(\frac{Q}{2}-P_1\pm 2P')}{\Gamma_b(\frac{Q}{2}-P_1\pm 2P)} \int_{i\mathbb{R}} \frac{du}{i}\ e^{4\pi iPu} \prod_{\pm,\pm} S_b\left(\tfrac{Q}{4}+\tfrac{P_1}{2} \pm u\pm P'\right)\ .$$

=== Hypergeometric blocks ===
For a four-point function on the sphere

$$\left\langle V_{\langle 2,1 \rangle}(x)\prod_{i=1}^3 V_{\Delta_i}(z_i)\right\rangle$$

where one field has a null vector at level two, the second-order BPZ equation reduces to the hypergeometric equation. A basis of solutions is made of the two s-channel conformal blocks that are allowed by the fusion rules, and these blocks can be written in terms of the hypergeometric function,

$$\begin{align}
\mathcal{F}^{(s)}_{P_1+\epsilon\frac{b}{2}}(z)
&= z^{\frac12+\frac{b^2}{2}+b\epsilon P_1} (1-z)^{\frac12+\frac{b^2}{2}+bP_3}
\\ &\times
F\left(\tfrac12 + b(\epsilon P_1+P_2+P_3),\tfrac12 + b(\epsilon P_1-P_2+P_3),1 + 2b\epsilon P_1,z\right),
\end{align}$$

with $\epsilon\in\{+,-\}.$ Another basis is made of the two t-channel conformal blocks,

$$\begin{align}
\mathcal{F}^{(t)}_{P_3+\epsilon\frac{b}{2}}(z)
&= z^{\frac12+\frac{b^2}{2}+b P_1} (1-z)^{\frac12+\frac{b^2}{2}+b\epsilon P_3}
\\ &\times
F\left(\tfrac12 + b( P_1+P_2+\epsilon P_3),\tfrac12 + b(P_1-P_2+\epsilon P_3), 1 + 2b\epsilon P_3,1-z\right).
\end{align}$$

The fusing matrix is the matrix of size two such that

$$\mathcal{F}^{(s)}_{P_1+\epsilon_1\frac{b}{2}}(x) = \sum_{\epsilon_3=\pm} F_{\epsilon_1,\epsilon_3} \mathcal{F}^{(t)}_{P_3+\epsilon_3\frac{b}{2}}(x),$$

whose explicit expression is

$$F_{\epsilon_1,\epsilon_3} = \frac{\Gamma(1-2b\epsilon_1P_1)\Gamma(2b\epsilon_3P_3)}{\prod_\pm \Gamma(\frac12+b(-\epsilon_1P_1\pm P_2+\epsilon_3P_3))}.$$

Hypergeometric conformal blocks play an important role in the analytic bootstrap approach to two-dimensional CFT.

To some extent, these formulas generalize to sphere four-point blocks that involve $V_{\langle r,1 \rangle}$ with $r=3,4,5,\dots$, which obey BPZ equations of order $r$. Such blocks may be written as integrals over $r-1$ variables. The corresponding fusing matrices are still written in terms of the Gamma function.

=== Solutions of the Painlevé VI equation ===
If $c=1,$ then certain linear combinations of s-channel conformal blocks are solutions of the Painlevé VI nonlinear differential equation. The relevant linear combinations involve sums over sets of momentums of the type $P_s+i\Z.$ This allows conformal blocks to be deduced from solutions of the Painlevé VI equation and vice versa. This also leads to a relatively simple formula for the fusing matrix at $c=1.$ Curiously, the $c=\infty$ limit of conformal blocks is also related to the Painlevé VI equation. The relation between the $c=\infty$ and the $c=1$ limits, mysterious on the conformal field theory side, is explained naturally in the context of four dimensional gauge theories, using blowup equations, and can be generalized to other pairs $c, c'$of central charges.

== Generalizations ==
=== Other representations of the Virasoro algebra ===
The Virasoro conformal blocks that are described in this article are associated to a certain type of representations of the Virasoro algebra: highest-weight representations, in other words Verma modules and their cosets. Correlation functions that involve other types of representations give rise to other types of conformal blocks. For example:

- Logarithmic conformal field theory involves representations where the Virasoro generator $L_0$ is not diagonalizable, which give rise to blocks that depend logarithmically on field positions.
- Representations can be built from states on which some annihilation modes of the Virasoro algebra act diagonally, rather than vanishing. The corresponding conformal blocks have been called irregular conformal blocks.

=== Larger symmetry algebras ===
In a theory whose symmetry algebra is larger than the Virasoro algebra, for example a WZW model or a theory with W-symmetry, correlation functions can in principle be decomposed into Virasoro conformal blocks, but that decomposition typically involves too many terms to be useful. Instead, it is possible to use conformal blocks based on the larger algebra: for example, in a WZW model, conformal blocks based on the corresponding affine Lie algebra, which obey Knizhnik–Zamolodchikov equations.
