= Sergei Gukov =

Russian physicist

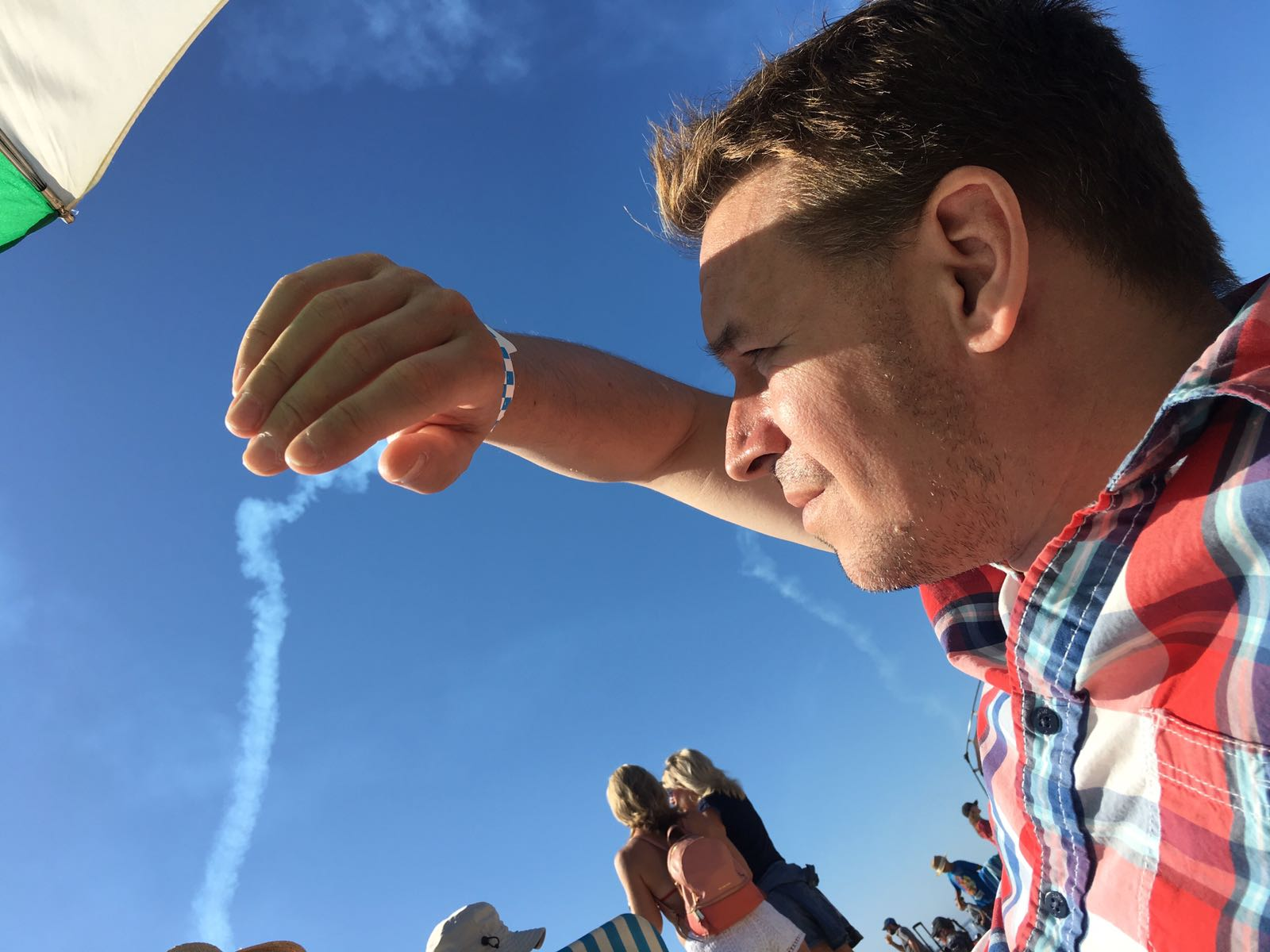
- Born: April 1977 (age 49); Moscow, Russian SFSR
- Education: MIPT, Princeton
- Known for: quantum topology, string theory, special holonomy manifolds, categorification of quantum group invariants, exact solutions of strongly coupled theories
- Awards: 1st Prize, USSR Physics Olympiad & Moscow Mathematics Olympiad (1992); Pomeranchuk Award for Young Scientists (2000); Clay Mathematics Institute Long Term Prize Fellowship (2001–2006); Sloan Research Fellowship in Science & Technology (2007)
- Scientific career
- Fields: mathematics, machine learning, theoretical physics
- Workplaces: Harvard, Caltech, UCSB, IAS, MPIM, Dublin Institute for Advanced Studies
- Doctoral advisor: Edward Witten

Sergei Gukov (Russian: Серге́й Гу́ков; born 1977) is a professor of mathematics and theoretical physics.

== Education ==
Gukov graduated from Moscow Institute of Physics and Technology (MIPT) in Moscow, Russia before obtaining a doctorate in physics from Princeton University under the supervision of Edward Witten.

== Career ==
=== Academic posts ===
He held a Long-term Prize fellowship of Clay Mathematics Institute at Harvard University (2001–2006) and during 2007-2008 was a member of the school of mathematics at the Institute for Advanced Study, Princeton.

Since 2007, he has been professor of mathematics and theoretical physics at the California Institute of Technology (Caltech). Starting 2010, Gukov was elected as an external scientific member of the Max Planck Society at the MPIM, Bonn.

In 2022 Gukov was appointed as a Senior Professor in the School of Theoretical Physics at Dublin Institute for Advanced Studies. There he has organised a number of important conferences including Computer science for knotty math problems and was lead organiser for ‘The Amplituhedron at 10 the first joint conference between the two oldest Institutes for Advanced Studies in the world Institute for Advanced Study and DIAS.

=== Committees and boards ===
Sergei Gukov is a member of the Scientific Board of the American Institute of Mathematics (AIM) and a member of the International Advisory Board of the Centre for Quantum Mathematics (QM). He has served on numerous other scientific committees and advisory boards. He is editor of the journal Communications in Mathematical Physics, Journal of Knot Theory and Its Ramifications, and Letters in Mathematical Physics.

=== Lectures ===
In 2010, along with Alain Connes, Gukov was invited to deliver the 8th Takagi Lectures, the only named lecture series of the Mathematical Society of Japan. In 2019, Gukov was invited to give the Whittemore Lectures at Yale University.

=== Research ===
Known for Gukov-Vafa-Witten superpotential, Gukov-Witten surface operators, and Gukov-Pei-Putrov-Vafa (GPPV) invariants. In recent years, he teamed up with Boris Feigin, Hiraku Nakajima and other mathematicians to explore hidden algebraic structures in topology and in quantum field theory.
