= Herman Verlinde =

Dutch physicist

- Born: 21 January 1962 (age 64); Woudenberg
- Education: Utrecht University
- Known for: Matrix string theory
- Scientific career
- Fields: Theoretical physics
- Workplaces: Princeton University
- Thesis: The path-integral formulation of supersymmetric string theory (1988)
- Doctoral advisor: Gerard 't Hooft

Herman Louis Verlinde (born 21 January 1962) is a Dutch theoretical physicist and string theorist. He is the Class of 1909 Professor of Physics at Princeton University, where he is also the chair of the Department of Physics. He is the identical twin brother of Erik Verlinde.

== Life and work ==
Verlinde studied theoretical physics at Utrecht University and received his PhD from the same university, supervised by Prof. Gerard 't Hooft. From 1995 to 1998, he was a full professor at the University of Amsterdam, after which he was appointed full professor at Princeton University.

He specializes in string theory and quantum field theory, and developed the Matrix String Theory together with his twin brother Erik Verlinde and Robbert Dijkgraaf.
