= S-matrix theory =

Precursor physical model to string theory and quantum chromodynamics

S-matrix theory was a proposal for replacing local quantum field theory as the basic principle of elementary particle physics.

It avoided the notion of space and time by replacing it with abstract mathematical properties of the S-matrix. In S-matrix theory, the S-matrix relates the infinite past to the infinite future in one step, without being decomposable into intermediate steps corresponding to time-slices.

This program was very influential in the 1960s, because it was a plausible substitute for quantum field theory, which was plagued with the zero interaction phenomenon at strong coupling. Applied to the strong interaction, it led to the development of string theory.

S-matrix theory was largely abandoned by physicists in the 1970s, as quantum chromodynamics was recognized to solve the problems of strong interactions within the framework of field theory. But in the guise of string theory, S-matrix theory is still a popular approach to the problem of quantum gravity.

The S-matrix theory is related to the holographic principle and the AdS/CFT correspondence by a flat space limit. The analog of the S-matrix relations in AdS space is the boundary conformal theory.

The most lasting legacy of the theory is string theory. Other notable achievements are the Froissart bound, and the prediction of the pomeron.

== History ==
S-matrix theory was proposed as a principle of particle interactions by Werner Heisenberg in 1943, following John Archibald Wheeler's 1937 introduction of the S-matrix.

It was developed heavily by Geoffrey Chew, Steven Frautschi, Stanley Mandelstam, Vladimir Gribov, and Tullio Regge. Some aspects of the theory were promoted by Lev Landau in the Soviet Union, and by Murray Gell-Mann in the United States.

In 1979, Steven Weinberg related S-matrix theory and effective field theories by postulating his "folk theorem".

== Basic principles ==
The basic principles are:

1. Relativity: The S-matrix is a representation of the Poincaré group;
2. Unitarity: $S S^{\dagger} = 1$;
3. Analyticity: integral relations and singularity conditions.

The basic analyticity principles were also called analyticity of the first kind, and they were never fully enumerated, but they include

1. Crossing: The amplitudes for antiparticle scattering are the analytic continuation of particle scattering amplitudes.
2. Dispersion relations: the values of the S-matrix can be calculated by integrals over internal energy variables of the imaginary part of the same values.
3. Causality conditions: the singularities of the S-matrix can only occur in ways that don't allow the future to influence the past (motivated by Kramers–Kronig relations)
4. Landau principle: Any singularity of the S-matrix corresponds to production thresholds of physical particles.

These principles were to replace the notion of microscopic causality in field theory, the idea that field operators exist at each spacetime point, and that spacelike separated operators commute with one another.

== Bootstrap models ==
The basic principles were too general to apply directly, because they are satisfied automatically by any field theory. So to apply to the real world, additional principles were added.

The phenomenological way in which this was done was by taking experimental data and using the dispersion relations to compute new limits. This led to the discovery of some particles, and to successful parameterizations of the interactions of pions and nucleons.

This path was mostly abandoned because the resulting equations, devoid of any space-time interpretation, were very difficult to understand and solve.

== Regge theory ==
The principle behind the Regge theory hypothesis (also called analyticity of the second kind or the bootstrap principle) is that all strongly interacting particles lie on Regge trajectories. This was considered the definitive sign that all the hadrons are composite particles, but within S-matrix theory, they are not thought of as being made up of elementary constituents.

The Regge theory hypothesis allowed for the construction of string theories, based on bootstrap principles. The additional assumption was the narrow resonance approximation, which started with stable particles on Regge trajectories, and added interaction loop by loop in a perturbation series.

String theory was given a Feynman path-integral interpretation a little while later. The path integral in this case is the analog of a sum over particle paths, not of a sum over field configurations. Feynman's original path integral formulation of field theory also had little need for local fields, since Feynman derived the propagators and interaction rules largely using Lorentz invariance and unitarity.

== See also ==
- Landau pole
- Regge trajectory
- Bootstrap model
- Pomeron
- Dual resonance model
- History of string theory
