= Bootstrap model =

Theory in particle physics

In particle physics, the bootstrap model, bootstrap principle or hadron boostrap is a superseded hypothesis about the composition of elementary particles interacting under the strong nuclear interaction. It uses general consistency criteria to determine the form of a quantum field theory from assumptions on the spectrum of particles. It is a form of S-matrix theory. The term is derived from bootstrapping as in 'pulling oneself up by one's bootstraps,' as particles appear from self-consistency.

It was first proposed in 1959 by Geoffrey Chew to explain particles interacting through the strong interaction. It fell out of favor in the 1970s with the rise of quantum chromodynamics, which described hadrons (mesons and baryons) in terms of elementary particles called quarks and gluons. Nevertheless, the bootstrap model was important for the development of string theory.

== History ==
In 1943, Werner Heisenberg constructed a theory based on the properties of the S-matrix. While Heisenberg's program was not immediately taken seriously, during the 1950s scientists like Stanley Mandelstam, Murray Gell-Mann, Steven Frautschi and Francis E. Low used his idea to develop S-matrix theory.

In the 1960s, the ever-growing list of hadrons in the particle zoo made physicist think that the nature of the strong interaction had to be reformulated. Geoffrey Chew and Mandelstam attempted to build a theory of hadrons based on S-matrix theory, rejecting standard quantum field theory. Chew used the term "bootstrap hypothesis" for the first time in 1961 considering all hadrons as manifestations of the same interaction, unaware of the work of Heisenberg. As suggested by Gell-Mann, Chew advocated for nuclear democracy, the idea that there was no hadron that was more elementary than the others. This idea was in contrast with the "aristocratic" picture of quantum electrodynamics.

In 1962, Fredrik Zachariasen and Charles Zemach used the bootstrap model to derive the properties of the rho meson, a resonance of pion scattering recently discovered in particle accelerators. They derived the mass of the rho meson to reasonable precision.

Right after, the quark model started to emerge, proposed by Gell-Mann and George Zweig in 1964, indicating that hadrons were composed of more elementary particles called quarks, but the prevailing opinion was that quarks were not physical and were just mathematical artifacts.

During the 1967 Solvay Conference, Chew and Gell-Mann presented their theories. Gell-Mann tried to connect the bootstrap model with his quark model. It was the last Solvay Conference on particle physics. Gell-Mann in general did not consider that there was a conflict between the two models.

=== Failure and rebirth ===
Between 1967 and 1973, deep inelastic scattering experiments at SLAC National Accelerator Laboratory confirmed the existence of quarks and the bootstrap model was superseded by the development of quantum chromodynamics. The bootstrap theory was never refuted by experiments but it was considered unsatisfactory as it had not delivered on its promises.

Chew and other scientists still continued to explore bootstrap models for other systems. In 1969, the bootstrap procedure was used by Gabriele Veneziano to construct the Veneziano amplitude formula, which led to the development of string theory.

== Motivation ==
The reason the program had any hope of success was because of crossing, the principle that the forces between particles are determined by particle exchange. Once the spectrum of particles is known, the force law is known, and this means that the spectrum is constrained to bound states which form through the action of these forces. The simplest way to solve the consistency condition is to postulate a few elementary particles of spin less than or equal to one, and construct the scattering perturbatively through field theory, but this method does not allow for composite particles of spin greater than 1 and without the then undiscovered phenomenon of confinement, it is naively inconsistent with the observed Regge behavior of hadrons.

Chew and followers believed that it would be possible to use crossing symmetry and Regge behavior to formulate a consistent S-matrix for infinitely many particle types. The Regge hypothesis would determine the spectrum, crossing and analyticity would determine the scattering amplitude (the forces), while unitarity would determine the self-consistent quantum corrections in a way analogous to including loops. The only fully successful implementation of the program required another assumption to organize the mathematics of unitarity (the narrow resonance approximation). This meant that all the hadrons were stable particles in the first approximation, so that scattering and decays could be thought of as a perturbation. This allowed a bootstrap model with infinitely many particle types to be constructed like a field theory. The lowest order scattering amplitude should show Regge behavior and unitarity would determine the loop corrections order by order.

Many in the bootstrap community believed that quantum field theory, which was plagued by problems of definition, was fundamentally inconsistent at high energies. Some believed that there is only one consistent theory which requires infinitely many particle species and whose form can be found by consistency alone. This is nowadays known not to be true, since there are many theories which are nonperturbatively consistent, each with their own S-matrix. Without the narrow-resonance approximation, the bootstrap program did not have a clear expansion parameter, and the consistency equations were often complicated and unwieldy, so that the method had limited success. This led to the development of string theory.

== Philosophy ==
Geoffrey Chew considered two kinds of bootstrap hypotheses, the partial-hypothesis applied to hadrons and a complete bootstrap hypothesis. The latter asserted that "nature is as it is because this is the only possible nature consistent with itself." This metaphysical version has similarities with the philosophy of Gottfried Wilhelm Leibniz. However Chew never developed a full bootstrap philosophy and at various times he considered this broad hypothesis was counter-productive and unscientific.

The bootstrap philosophy was repurposed by the Fundamental Fysiks Group, specially Henry Stapp and Fritjof Capra. In the New Age 1975 book, The Tao of Physics, Capra supports the democratic S-matrix theory philosophy, which he tied to Mahayana Buddhism, over quantum field theory. Capra considered that the bootstrap philosophy was "a radical break in the Western approach of fundamental science" and that was as or more influential than the theory of relativity or quantum mechanics.

Scholars of postmodernism and social constructionism have discussed the bootstrap theory. English professor Robert Markley considered that the decline of the bootstrap program was more ideological than scientific.

== See also ==
- Tullio Regge
- Stanley Mandelstam
- Conformal bootstrap
