= Claud Lovelace =

Physicist working on string theory (1934–2012)

- Born: January 16, 1934; Canterbury, England
- Died: September 7, 2012 (aged 78); Piscataway, New Jersey, United States
- Education: University of Cape Town; Imperial College, London (no degree)
- Known for: Research in bosonic string theory, showing that the nonplanar loop diagram complies with unitarity only for 26 spacetime dimensions
- Scientific career
- Workplaces: Imperial College, London; CERN; Rutgers University
- Academic advisors: Abdus Salam

Claud Lovelace (16 January 1934 – 7 September 2012) was a theoretical physicist noted for his contributions to string theory, specifically, the idea that strings did not have to be restricted to the four dimensions of spacetime.

A study in 2009 ranked him as the 14th most influential physicist in the world for the period 1967–1973.

== Biography ==
Claud William Venton Lovelace was born in Canterbury, England on January 16, 1934. His family emigrated to South Africa, and Lovelace began to study physics on his own at the age of 15. He received a B.Sc. from the University of Cape Town in 1954, at the age of 20, but then turned to architecture. Lovelace returned to physics in 1958 for graduate studies at Imperial College, London, under the supervision of Abdus Salam, who shared the 1979 Nobel Prize in Physics for his contributions to the electroweak theory, which unifies weak and electromagnetic interaction between elementary particles.

Lovelace did not complete his Ph.D., and in 1965 left Imperial College for a position with Daniele Amati at the European Organization for Nuclear Research (CERN), in Geneva, Switzerland. There, Lovelace began to investigate the role of hadrons in string theory. At the time, researchers were investigating two types of string interaction models: Reggeons (open-ended strings) and Pomerons (closed-loop strings). One of the prerequisites for these models to be credible required unitarity in the ordinary four dimensions of spacetime, which the Pomeron model could not show. Instead, the theory yielded strange (hypothetical) entities – named tachyons – that, among other characteristics, had to be able to travel backwards in time and be faster than light, both of which are violations of the ordinary four dimensions of spacetime.

In attempting to resolve the dilemma, Lovelace relaxed the assumption that strings had to be restricted to four dimensions. This premise was not unheard of. Abstract five-dimensional space was already a legitimate mathematical construct, and the boson-exchange theories of Theodor Kaluza and Oskar Klein required a fifth dimension for the unification of gravitation with electromagnetism (Kaluza–Klein theory, 1921). Similarly, in the 1930s and 1940s, Albert Einstein had considered fifth-dimensional unification before turning to other approaches. But Lovelace did not stop with the fifth or sixth dimension. Instead, he continued to increase the number of dimensions until, strangely, at D = 26 the problem with tachyons vanished and unitarity was restored.

Despite the earlier models that worked in more than four dimensions, at the time nobody took anything more than four dimensions too seriously. Lovelace did not think his discovery would be taken seriously either, but chose to publish it anyway. In 'Pomeron form factors and dual Regge cuts' (Physics Letters, B34, Issue 6, March 1971, pp. 500–506), he announced his 26th dimension observation towards the end of the seven page paper. Lovelace's observation changed the way that strings are thought about, and the existence of more than four dimensions is today generally accepted in modeling theory.

In September 1971, Lovelace moved to Piscataway, New Jersey, where he obtained a professorship at Rutgers University despite his lack of a Ph.D. He remained there for the rest of his life, grappling with the nuances of various versions of string theory. Claud Lovelace died of prostatic cancer in 2012. He left his estate to Rutgers University, which provides the endowed Lovelace Chair in Physics in his name.
