= Regge =

Regge may refer to

- Tullio Regge (1931-2014), Italian physicist, developer of Regge calculus and Regge theory
- Regge calculus, formalism for producing simplicial approximations of spacetimes
- Regge theory, study of the analytic properties of scattering
- 3778 Regge, main-belt asteroid
- Regge (river), river in Overijssel, the Netherlands
