= Chan–Paton factor =

Multivalued index associated with the endpoints of an open string

In theoretical physics, the Chan–Paton factor (named after Hong-Mo Chan and Jack E. Paton) is a multivalued index associated with the endpoints of an open string. An open string can be interpreted as a flux tube connecting a quark and its antiparticle. The two Chan–Paton factors make the string transform as a tensor under a gauge group whose charges are carried by the endpoints of the strings.

The procedure of enabling isospin factors to be added to the Veneziano model is known as Chan–Paton rules or Chan–Paton method.

After the second superstring revolution in 1995, Chan–Paton factors are interpreted as labels that identify which (spacetime-filling) D-branes the stringy endpoints are attached to. The Chan–Paton factors have become a special case of a more general concept.
