= Stanley Mandelstam =

South African theoretical physicist (1928-2016)

- Born: 12 December 1928; Johannesburg, South Africa
- Died: 11 June 2016 (aged 87); Berkeley, California, U.S.
- Education: University of the Witwatersrand, Birmingham University, Trinity College, Cambridge
- Known for: Double dispersion relations Mandelstam variables
- Awards: Dirac Medal (1991); Dannie Heineman Prize for Mathematical Physics (1992)
- Scientific career
- Fields: Particle physics String theory
- Workplaces: University of the Witwatersrand; University of California, Berkeley; University of Birmingham
- Thesis: Some Contributions to the Theory and Application of the Bethe-Salpeter Equation (1956)
- Doctoral advisor: Rudolf Peierls
- Other academic advisors: Paul Taunton Matthews
- Doctoral students: Michio Kaku; Charles Thorn; Joseph Polchinski

Stanley Mandelstam (/ˈmændəlstæm/; 12 December 1928 – 23 June 2016) was a South African theoretical physicist. He introduced the relativistically invariant Mandelstam variables into particle physics in 1958 as a convenient coordinate system for formulating his double dispersion relations. The double dispersion relations were a central tool in the bootstrap program which sought to formulate a consistent theory of infinitely many particle types of increasing spin.

== Early life ==
Mandelstam was born in Johannesburg, South Africa to a Jewish family.

== Work ==
Mandelstam, along with Tullio Regge, did the initial development of the Regge theory of strong interaction phenomenology. He reinterpreted the analytic growth rate of the scattering amplitude as a function of the cosine of the scattering angle as the power law for the falloff of scattering amplitudes at high energy. Along with the double dispersion relations, Regge theory allowed theorists to find sufficient analytic constraints on scattering amplitudes of bound states to formulate a theory in which there are infinitely many particle types, none of which are fundamental.

After Veneziano constructed the first tree-level scattering amplitude describing infinitely many particle types, what was recognized almost immediately as a string scattering amplitude, Mandelstam continued to make crucial contributions. He interpreted the Virasoro algebra discovered in consistency conditions as a geometrical symmetry of a world-sheet conformal field theory, formulating string theory in terms of two dimensional quantum field theory. He used the conformal invariance to calculate tree level string amplitudes on many worldsheet domains. Mandelstam was the first to explicitly construct the fermion scattering amplitudes in the Ramond and Neveu–Schwarz sectors of superstring theory, and later gave arguments for the finiteness of string perturbation theory.

In quantum field theory, Mandelstam and independently Sidney Coleman extended work of Tony Skyrme to show that the two dimensional quantum Sine-Gordon model is equivalently described by a Thirring model whose fermions are the kinks. He also demonstrated that the 4d N=4 supersymmetric gauge theory is power counting finite, proving that this theory is scale invariant to all orders of perturbation theory, the first example of a field theory where all the infinities in Feynman diagrams cancel.

Among his students at Berkeley are Joseph Polchinski, Michio Kaku, Charles Thorn and Hessamaddin Arfaei.

Stanley Mandelstam died in his Berkeley apartment in June, 2016.

== Education ==
- University of the Witwatersrand, South Africa (BSc, 1952)
- Trinity College, Cambridge (BA, 1954)
- University of Birmingham (PhD, 1956)

== Career ==
- Professor of Mathematical Physics, University of Birmingham, 1960–63
- Professor of Physics, University of California, Berkeley, since 1963 (Professor Emeritus since 1994)
- Professeur Associé, Université de Paris-Sud, 1979–80 and 1984–85

== Honours ==
- Fellow of the Royal Society, 1962
- Dirac Medal and Prize, International Centre for Theoretical Physics, 1991
- Fellow, American Academy of Arts and Sciences, 1992
- Dannie Heineman Prize for Mathematical Physics, American Physical Society, 1992
