= Dual resonance model =

Model in string theory

In theoretical physics, a dual resonance model arose during the early investigation (1968–1973) of string theory as an S-matrix theory of the strong interaction.

== Overview ==
The dual resonance model was based upon the observation that the amplitudes for the s-channel scatterings matched exactly with the amplitudes for the t-channel scatterings among mesons and also the Regge trajectory. It began with the Euler beta function model of Gabriele Veneziano in 1968 for a 4-particle amplitude which has the property that it is explicitly s–t crossing symmetric, exhibits duality between the description in terms of Regge poles or of resonances, and provides a closed-form solution to non-linear finite-energy sum rules relating s- and t- channels.

The Veneziano formula was quickly generalized to an equally consistent N-particle amplitude for which Yoichiro Nambu, Holger Bech Nielsen, and Leonard Susskind provided a physical interpretation in terms of an infinite number of simple harmonic oscillators describing the motion of an extended one-dimensional string, hence came the name "string theory."

The study of dual resonance models was a relatively popular subject of study between 1968 and 1973. It was even taught briefly as a graduate level course at MIT, by Sergio Fubini and Veneziano, who co-authored an early article. It fell rapidly out of favor around 1973 when quantum chromodynamics became the main focus of theoretical research (mainly due to the theoretical appeal of its asymptotic freedom).

== See also ==
- QCD string
- Lund string model
