= Froissart bound =

Constraint on particle cross sections

In particle physics the Froissart bound, or Froissart limit, is a generic constraint that the total scattering cross section of two colliding high-energy particles cannot increase faster than $c \ln^2(s)$, with c a normalization constant and s the square of the center-of-mass energy (s is one of the three Mandelstam variables).

== See also ==
- Unitarity (physics) § Unitarity bounds
- S-matrix theory
- Regge theory
