= Steven Frautschi =

American theoretical physicist (b. 1933)

Steven C. Frautschi (/ˈfraʊtʃi/; born December 6, 1933) is an American theoretical physicist, and professor of physics emeritus at the California Institute of Technology (Caltech). He is known principally for his contributions to the bootstrap theory of the strong interactions and for his contribution to the resolution of the infrared divergence problem in quantum electrodynamics (QED). He was named a Fellow of the American Physical Society in 2015 for "contributions to the introduction of Regge poles into particle physics, elucidation of the role of infrared photons in high energy scattering, and for seminal contributions to undergraduate physics education".

== Education and employment ==
Frautschi graduated from Harvard College in 1954 and received his PhD from Stanford University in 1958, having written his dissertation on PC conservation in strong interactions and wide angle pair production and quantum electrodynamics at small distances, under the supervision of Sidney Drell. Frautschi worked as a postdoctoral researcher in the groups of Hideki Yukawa at Kyoto University and later of Geoffrey Chew at the University of California, Berkeley. He was an assistant professor at Cornell University before moving to Caltech in 1962. At Caltech he was the Executive Officer for Physics in 1988-97, and Master of Student Houses in 1997-2002. He received the Feynman Prize for Excellence in Teaching in 2014.

== Work ==
=== Subjects of his works ===
In 1961, Chew and Frautschi discovered that the mesons fall into straight-line Regge trajectories (in their scheme, spin is plotted against mass squared on a so-called Chew–Frautschi plot), and the two of them introduced the pomeron into the western literature. Frautschi's most well known contribution to strong-interaction theory was the statistical bootstrap, a prediction that the number of hadronic states grows exponentially with energy. This is nowadays understood as a manifestation of the deconfinement phase transition. The exponential growth is incorporated into string theory, where it is known as the Hagedorn temperature. (This S-matrix approach to the strong interactions was largely abandoned by the particle physics community in the 1970s in light of quantum chromodynamics.)

In 1961, with Donald R. Yennie and Hiroshi Suura, he elucidated the role of infrared photons properly summed in high-energy QED. This work was one of the keys to solving the problem of infrared divergences in gauge theories.

One of Frautschi's doctoral students at Caltech was Roger Dashen.

=== Publications ===
- 1982 Entropy in an Expanding Universe. Science 13/08/1982: Vol. 217, Issue 4560, pp. 593–599 (DOI: 10.1126/science.217.4560.593)
- 1986 The Mechanical Universe, Mechanics and Heat, Advanced Edition, textbook (Steven C. Frautschi, Richard P. Olenick, Tom M. Apostol, David L. Goodstein). New York: Cambridge University Press (1st pbk. ed. 2008).

== Family ==
His daughters, Jennifer and Laura, are both professional violinists.
