= Tamiaki Yoneya =

Japanese string theorist

Tamiaki Yoneya (米谷民明, Yoneya Tamiaki) (born 1947) is a Japanese physicist.

Independently of Joël Scherk and John H. Schwarz, he realized that string theory describes, among other things, the force of gravity. Yoneya has worked on the stringy extension of the uncertainty principle for many years.

== Selected publications ==
- Yoneya, T. (1973). "Quantum gravity and the zero-slope limit of the generalized Virasoro model". Lettere al Nuovo Cimento. 8 (16). Springer Science and Business Media LLC: 951–955. doi:10.1007/bf02727806. ISSN 1827-613X. S2CID 120096939.
- Yoneya, Tamiaki (1978). "Z(N) topological excitations in Yang-Mills theories: duality and confinement". Nuclear Physics B. 144 (1). Elsevier BV: 195–218. Bibcode:1978NuPhB.144..195Y. doi:10.1016/0550-3213(78)90502-3. ISSN 0550-3213.
- YONEYA, TAMIAKI (1989-08-20). "On the interpretation of minimal length in string theories". Modern Physics Letters A. 04 (16). World Scientific Pub Co Pte Lt: 1587–1595. Bibcode:1989MPLA....4.1587Y. doi:10.1142/s0217732389001817. ISSN 0217-7323.
- Jevicki, Antal; Yoneya, Tamiaki (1994). "A deformed matrix model and the black-hole background in two-dimensional string theory". Nuclear Physics B. 411 (1): 64–96. arXiv:hep-th/9305109. Bibcode:1994NuPhB.411...64J. doi:10.1016/0550-3213(94)90054-x. ISSN 0550-3213. S2CID 7279947.
- Yoneya, T. (1997-06-01). "Schild Action and Space-Time Uncertainty Principle in String Theory". Progress of Theoretical Physics. 97 (6): 949–961. arXiv:hep-th/9703078. Bibcode:1997PThPh..97..949Y. doi:10.1143/ptp.97.949. ISSN 0033-068X. S2CID 6614819.
- Li, Miao; Yoneya, Tamiaki (1997-02-17). "Pointlike D-brane Dynamics and Space-Time Uncertainty Relation". Physical Review Letters. 78 (7): 1219–1222. arXiv:hep-th/9611072. Bibcode:1997PhRvL..78.1219L. doi:10.1103/physrevlett.78.1219. ISSN 0031-9007.
- "D-particles, D-instantons, and a space-time uncertainty principle in string theory." arXiv preprint hep-th/9707002 (1997).
- Jevicki, Antal; Yoneya, Tamiaki (1998). "Space-time uncertainty principle and conformal symmetry in D-particle dynamics". Nuclear Physics B. 535 (1–2). Elsevier BV: 335–348. arXiv:hep-th/9805069. Bibcode:1998NuPhB.535..335J. doi:10.1016/s0550-3213(98)00578-1. ISSN 0550-3213. S2CID 10986754.
- Li, Miao; Yoneya, Tamiaki (1999). "Short-distance space-time structure and black holes in string theory: a short review of the present status". Chaos, Solitons & Fractals. 10 (2–3): 423–443. arXiv:hep-th/9806240. Bibcode:1999CSF....10..423L. doi:10.1016/s0960-0779(98)00198-2. ISSN 0960-0779. S2CID 17512463.
- Jevicki, Antal; Kazama, Yoichi; Yoneya, Tamiaki (1999-02-02). "Generalized conformal symmetry in D-brane matrix models". Physical Review D. 59 (6) 066001. arXiv:hep-th/9810146. Bibcode:1999PhRvD..59f6001J. doi:10.1103/physrevd.59.066001. ISSN 0556-2821. S2CID 16578384.
- Okawa, Yuji; Yoneya, Tamiaki (1999). "Multi-body interactions of D-particles in supergravity and Matrix theory". Nuclear Physics B. 538 (1–2). Elsevier BV: 67–99. arXiv:hep-th/9806108. Bibcode:1999NuPhB.538...67O. doi:10.1016/s0550-3213(98)00700-7. ISSN 0550-3213. S2CID 2589801.
- Yoneya, T. (2000-06-01). "String Theory and the Space-Time Uncertainty Principle". Progress of Theoretical Physics. 103 (6): 1081–1125. arXiv:hep-th/0004074. Bibcode:2000PThPh.103.1081Y. doi:10.1143/ptp.103.1081. ISSN 0033-068X. S2CID 14078711.
- Awata, Hidetoshi; Li, Miao; Minic, Djordje; Yoneya, Tamiaki (2001-02-08). "On the quantization of Nambu brackets". Journal of High Energy Physics. 2001 (2): 013. arXiv:hep-th/9906248. Bibcode:2001JHEP...02..013A. doi:10.1088/1126-6708/2001/02/013. ISSN 1029-8479. S2CID 15254956.
- "Gravity from strings: personal reminiscence on early developments." arXiv preprint arXiv:0901.0079 (2008).
