= Veneziano amplitude =

1968 physics-related discovery

In theoretical physics, the Veneziano amplitude refers to the discovery made in 1968 by Italian theoretical physicist Gabriele Veneziano that the Euler beta function, when interpreted as a scattering amplitude, has many of the features needed to explain the physical properties of strongly interacting mesons, such as symmetry and duality. Conformal symmetry was soon discovered. This discovery can be considered the birth of string theory, as the invention of string theory came about as a search for a physical model which would give rise to such a scattering amplitude. In particular, the amplitude appears as the four tachyon scattering amplitude in oriented open bosonic string theory. Using Mandelstam variables and the beta function $B(x,y)$, the amplitude is given by

$$S(k_1,k_2,k_3,k_4) = \frac{2i g_o^2}{\alpha'}(2\pi)^{26}\delta^{26}(\Sigma_i k_i)\big[B(\alpha(s),\alpha(t))+B(\alpha(s),\alpha(u))+B(\alpha(t),\alpha(u))\big]$$

where $\alpha'$ is the string constant, $k_i$ are the tachyon four-vectors, $g_o$ is the open string theory coupling constant, and $\alpha(x) = -1-\alpha'x$.

== See also ==
- Beta function
- Crossing (physics)
- Dual resonance model
- History of string theory
- Regge theory
- Chan–Paton factor
