= Ryan Rohm =

American string theorist

Ryan Milton Rohm (born 22 December 1957 in Gastonia, North Carolina) is an American string theorist. He is one of four physicists known as the Princeton string quartet, and is responsible for the development of heterotic string theory along with David Gross, Jeffrey A. Harvey and Emil Martinec, the other members of the Princeton String Quartet.

== Education ==
Rohm studied physics and mathematics at North Carolina State University (NCSU) with a bachelor's degree in 1980 and received a Ph.D. in physics from Princeton University in 1985. He was a postdoc from 1985 to 1988 at Caltech.

== Career ==
From 1988 to 1995, Rohm was an assistant professor at Boston University. In 1997 he earned a master's degree in computer science at NCSU. Since 1998 he has worked on experimental neutrino physics in the KamLAND experiment and at the Triangle Universities Nuclear Laboratory (TUNL). Since 1997 he has also been an adjunct professor at the University of North Carolina at Chapel Hill.

== Selected publications ==
- Rohm, R; Witten, E (1986). "The antisymmetric tensor field in superstring theory". Annals of Physics. 170 (2). Elsevier BV: 454–489. Bibcode:1986AnPhy.170..454R. doi:10.1016/0003-4916(86)90099-0. ISSN 0003-4916.
- Dine, M.; Rohm, R.; Seiberg, N.; Witten, E. (1985). "Gluino condensation in superstring models". Physics Letters B. 156 (1–2). Elsevier BV: 55–60. Bibcode:1985PhLB..156...55D. doi:10.1016/0370-2693(85)91354-1. ISSN 0370-2693.
- Horowitz, Gary T.; Lykken, Joseph; Rohm, Ryan; Strominger, Andrew (1986-07-21). "Purely Cubic Action for String Field Theory". Physical Review Letters. 57 (3). American Physical Society (APS): 283–286. Bibcode:1986PhRvL..57..283H. doi:10.1103/physrevlett.57.283. ISSN 0031-9007. PMID 10034020.
- Spontaneous supersymmetry breaking in supersymmetric string theories, Nuclear Physics B, vol. 237, 1984, p. 553 doi:10.1016/0550-3213(84)90007-5
