= Pomeron =

Family of particles of increasing spin

In physics, the pomeron is a Regge trajectory — a family of particles with increasing spin — postulated in 1961 to explain the slowly rising cross section of hadronic collisions at high energies. It is named after Isaak Pomeranchuk.

== Overview ==
While other trajectories lead to falling cross sections, the pomeron can lead to logarithmically rising cross sections — which, experimentally, are approximately constant ones. The identification of the pomeron and the prediction of its properties was a major success of the Regge theory of strong interaction phenomenology. In later years, a Balitsky–Fadin–Kuraev–Lipatov (BFKL) pomeron (named after Ian Balitsky, Victor Fadin, Eduard A. Kuraev and Lev Lipatov) was derived in further kinematic regimes from perturbative calculations in quantum chromodynamics (QCD), but its relationship to the pomeron seen in soft high energy scattering is still not fully understood.

One consequence of the pomeron hypothesis is that the cross sections of proton–proton and proton–antiproton scattering should be equal at high enough energies. This was demonstrated by the Soviet physicist Isaak Pomeranchuk by analytic continuation assuming only that the cross sections do not fall. The pomeron itself was introduced by Vladimir Gribov, and it incorporated this theorem into Regge theory. Geoffrey Chew and Steven Frautschi introduced the pomeron in the West. The modern interpretation of Pomeranchuk's theorem is that the pomeron has no conserved charges—the particles on this trajectory have the quantum numbers of the vacuum.

The pomeron was well accepted in the 1960s despite the fact that the measured cross sections of proton–proton and proton–antiproton scattering at the energies then available were unequal.

The pomeron carries no charges. The absence of electric charge implies that pomeron exchange does not lead to the usual shower of Cherenkov radiation, while the absence of color charge implies that such events do not radiate pions.

This is in accord with experimental observation. In high energy proton–proton and proton–antiproton collisions in which it is believed that pomerons have been exchanged, a rapidity gap is often observed: This is a large angular region in which no outgoing particles are detected.

== Odderon ==
The odderon, the counterpart of the pomeron that carries odd charge parity, was introduced in 1973 by Leszek Łukaszuk and Basarab Nicolescu. Odderons exist in QCD as a compound state of three reggeized gluons. Potentially theorized in 2015. It was potentially observed only in 2017 by the TOTEM experiment at the LHC. This observation was later confirmed in a joint analysis with the DØ experiment at the Tevatron and appeared in the media as the particle's discovery in March 2021.

== String theory ==
In early particle physics, the 'pomeron sector' was what is now called the 'closed string sector' while what was called the 'reggeon sector' is now the 'open string theory'.

== See also ==
- Giuseppe Cocconi
- Tamás Csörgő
