= Geoffrey Chew =

American theoretical physicist (1924–2019)

Geoffrey F. Chew
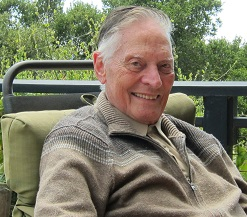
- Chew at his California home in July 2014
- Born: June 5, 1924; Washington, D.C., U.S.
- Died: April 12, 2019 (aged 94); Berkeley, California, U.S.
- Education: University of Chicago
- Known for: S-matrix theory Bootstrap model, Chew–Frautschi plot
- Awards: Hughes Prize (1962); Lawrence Prize (1969); Majorana Prize (2008)
- Scientific career
- Fields: Theoretical physics
- Workplaces: University of Illinois; University of California, Berkeley
- Doctoral advisor: Enrico Fermi
- Doctoral students: David Gross; Freda Friedman Salzman; John H. Schwarz; John R. Taylor

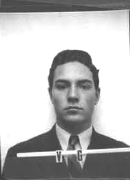
Geoffrey F. Chew Los Alamos ID

Geoffrey Foucar Chew (/tʃuː/; June 5, 1924 – April 12, 2019) was an American theoretical physicist. He is known for his bootstrap theory of strong interactions.

== Life ==
Chew worked as a professor of physics at the UC Berkeley since 1957 and was an emeritus since 1991. Chew held a PhD in theoretical particle physics (1944–1946) from the University of Chicago. Between 1950 and 1956, he was a physics faculty member at the University of Illinois. In addition, Chew was a member of the National Academy of Sciences as well as the American Academy of Arts and Sciences. He was also a founding member of the International Center for Transdisciplinary Research (CIRET).

Chew was a student of Enrico Fermi. His students include David Gross, one of the winners of the 2004 Nobel Prize in Physics, and John H. Schwarz, one of the pioneers of string theory.

Chew married Ruth E. Wright (d. 1971) in 1945, with whom he had two twin children, Berkeley Chew and Beverly Chew. He had three children, Pierre Chew, Jean-Francois Chew, and Pauline Chew, with his second wife, Denyse.

== Work ==
Chew was known as a leader of the S-matrix approach to the strong interaction and the associated bootstrap principle, a theory whose popularity peaked in the 1960s when he led an influential theory group at the University of California, Berkeley. S-matrix theorists sought to understand the strong interaction by using the analytic properties of the scattering matrix to calculate the interactions of bound-states without assuming that there is a point-particle field theory underneath. The S-matrix approach did not provide a local space-time description. Although it was not immediately appreciated by the practitioners, it was a natural framework in which to produce a quantum theory of gravity.

Chew's central contribution to the program came in 1961: along with collaborator Steven Frautschi, they noted that the mesons fall into families (straight-line Regge trajectories) where the square of the mass of a meson is linearly proportional to the spin (in their scheme, spin is plotted against mass squared on a so-called Chew–Frautschi plot), with the same constant of proportionality for each of the families. Since bound states in quantum mechanics naturally fall into families of this sort, their conclusion, quickly accepted, was that none of the strongly interacting particles were elementary. The conservative point of view was that the bound states were made up of elementary particles, but Chew's more far-reaching vision was that there would be a new type of theory which describes the interactions of bound-states which have no point-like constituents at all. This approach was sometimes called nuclear democracy, since it avoided singling out certain particles as elementary.

== Legacy ==
Although the S-matrix approach to the strong interactions was largely abandoned by the particle physics community in the 1970s in favor of quantum chromodynamics, a consistent theory for the scattering of bound-states on straight-line trajectories was eventually constructed and is nowadays known as string theory. Within string theory, Edward Witten reinterpreted S-matrix theory as a flat-space statement of the holographic principle.

Professor Chew participated in religion and science discussions. He stated that an "appeal to God may be needed to answer the 'origin' question, 'Why should a quantum universe evolving toward a semiclassical limit be consistent?'"

Chew investigated into models in which the concept of happenings or (pre-)events play a fundamental role, not only particles. He saw similarities among his approach and the notion of occasion of Alfred North Whitehead.

== Awards ==
Chew received the Hughes Prize of the American Physics Society for his bootstrap theory of strong interactions in 1962. He also won the Lawrence Prize in 1969 and Majorana Prize in 2008.
