= Regge theory =

Study of the analytic properties of scattering amplitudes

In quantum physics, Regge theory (/ˈrɛdʒeɪ/ REJ-ay, Italian: [ˈrɛddʒe]) is the study of the analytic properties of scattering as a function of angular momentum, where the angular momentum is not restricted to be an integer multiple of ħ but is allowed to take any complex value. The nonrelativistic theory was developed by Tullio Regge in 1959.

== Details ==
Chew–Frautschi plot showing linear Regge trajectories.

The simplest example of Regge poles is provided by the quantum mechanical treatment of the Coulomb potential $V(r) = -e^2/(4\pi\epsilon_0r)$ or, phrased differently, by the quantum mechanical treatment of the binding or scattering of an electron of mass $m$ and electric charge $-e$ off a proton of mass $M$ and charge $+e$. The energy $E$ of the binding of the electron to the proton is negative whereas for scattering the energy is positive. The formula for the binding energy is the expression

$$E\rightarrow E_N = - \frac{2m'\pi^2e^4}{h^2N^2(4\pi\epsilon_0)^2} = - \frac{13.6\,\mathrm{eV}}{N^2}, \;\;\; m^' = \frac{mM}{M+m},$$

where $N = 1,2,3,...$, $h$ is the Planck constant, and $\epsilon_0$ is the permittivity of the vacuum. The principal quantum number $N$ is in quantum mechanics (by solution of the radial Schrödinger equation) found to be given by $N = n+l+1$, where $n=0,1,2,...$ is the radial quantum number and $l=0,1,2,3,...$ the quantum number of the orbital angular momentum. Solving the above equation for $l$, one obtains the equation

$$l\rightarrow l(E) = -n +g(E), \;\; g(E) = -1+i\frac{\pi e^2}{4\pi\epsilon_0h}(2m'/E)^{1/2}.$$

Considered as a complex function of $E$ this expression describes in the complex $l$-plane a path which is called a Regge trajectory. Thus in this consideration the orbital momentum can assume complex values.

Regge trajectories can be obtained for many other potentials, in particular also for the Yukawa potential.

Regge trajectories appear as poles of the scattering amplitude or in the related $S$-matrix. In the case of the Coulomb potential considered above this $S$-matrix is given by the following expression as can be checked by reference to any textbook on quantum mechanics:

$$S = \frac{\Gamma(l-g(E))}{\Gamma(l+g(E))}e^{-i\pi l},$$

where $\Gamma(x)$ is the gamma function, a generalization of factorial $(x-1)!$. This gamma function is a meromorphic function of its argument with simple poles at $x=-n, n=0,1,2,...$. Thus the expression for $S$ (the gamma function in the numerator) possesses poles at precisely those points which are given by the above expression for the Regge trajectories; hence the name Regge poles.

== History and implications ==
The main result of the theory is that the scattering amplitude for potential scattering grows as a function of the cosine $z$ of the scattering angle as a power that changes as the scattering energy changes:

$$A(z) \propto z^{l(E^2)}$$

where $l(E^2)$ is the noninteger value of the angular momentum of a would-be bound state with energy $E$. It is determined by solving the radial Schrödinger equation and it smoothly interpolates the energy of wavefunctions with different angular momentum but with the same radial excitation number. The trajectory function is a function of $s=E^2$ for relativistic generalization. The expression $l(s)$ is known as the Regge trajectory function, and when it is an integer, the particles form an actual bound state with this angular momentum. The asymptotic form applies when $z$ is much greater than one, which is not a physical limit in nonrelativistic scattering.

Shortly afterwards, Stanley Mandelstam noted that in relativity the purely formal limit of $z$ large is near to a physical limit — the limit of large $t$. Large $t$ means large energy in the crossed channel, where one of the incoming particles has an energy momentum that makes it an energetic outgoing antiparticle. This observation turned Regge theory from a mathematical curiosity into a physical theory: it demands that the function that determines the falloff rate of the scattering amplitude for particle-particle scattering at large energies is the same as the function that determines the bound state energies for a particle-antiparticle system as a function of angular momentum.

The switch required swapping the Mandelstam variable $s$, which is the square of the energy, for $t$, which is the squared momentum transfer, which for elastic soft collisions of identical particles is s times one minus the cosine of the scattering angle. The relation in the crossed channel becomes

$$A(z) \propto s^{l(t)}$$

which says that the amplitude has a different power law falloff as a function of energy at different corresponding angles, where corresponding angles are those with the same value of $t$. It predicts that the function that determines the power law is the same function that interpolates the energies where the resonances appear. The range of angles where scattering can be productively described by Regge theory shrinks into a narrow cone around the beam-line at large energies.

In 1960 Geoffrey Chew and Steven Frautschi conjectured from limited data that the strongly interacting particles had a very simple dependence of the squared-mass on the angular momentum: the particles fall into families where the Regge trajectory functions were straight lines: $l(s)=ks$ with the same constant $k$ for all the trajectories. The straight-line Regge trajectories were later understood as arising from massless endpoints on rotating relativistic strings. Since a Regge description implied that the particles were bound states, Chew and Frautschi concluded that none of the strongly interacting particles were elementary.

Experimentally, the near-beam behavior of scattering did fall off with angle as explained by Regge theory, leading many to accept that the particles in the strong interactions were composite. Much of the scattering was diffractive, meaning that the particles hardly scatter at all — staying close to the beam line after the collision. Vladimir Gribov noted that the Froissart bound combined with the assumption of maximum possible scattering implied there was a Regge trajectory that would lead to logarithmically rising cross sections, a trajectory nowadays known as the pomeron. He went on to formulate a quantitative perturbation theory for near beam line scattering dominated by multi-pomeron exchange.

From the fundamental observation that hadrons are composite, there grew two points of view. Some correctly advocated that there were elementary particles, nowadays called quarks and gluons, which made a quantum field theory in which the hadrons were bound states. Others also correctly believed that it was possible to formulate a theory without elementary particles — where all the particles were bound states lying on Regge trajectories and scatter self-consistently. This was called S-matrix theory.

The most successful S-matrix approach centered on the narrow-resonance approximation, the idea that there is a consistent expansion starting from stable particles on straight-line Regge trajectories. After many false starts, Richard Dolen, David Horn, and Christoph Schmid understood a crucial property that led Gabriele Veneziano to formulate a self-consistent scattering amplitude, the first string theory. Mandelstam noted that the limit where the Regge trajectories are straight is also the limit where the lifetime of the states is long.

As a fundamental theory of strong interactions at high energies, Regge theory enjoyed a period of interest in the 1960s, but it was largely succeeded by quantum chromodynamics. As a phenomenological theory, it is still an indispensable tool for understanding near-beam line scattering and scattering at very large energies. Modern research focuses both on the connection to perturbation theory and to string theory.

== See also ==
Unsolved problem in physics
How does Regge theory emerge from quantum chromodynamics at long distances?
More unsolved problems in physics
- Quark–gluon plasma
- Quasinormal mode
- Pomeron
- Cornell potential
- Dual resonance model
- S-matrix theory § Regge theory
