= Tullio Regge =

Italian theoretical physicist (1931–2014)

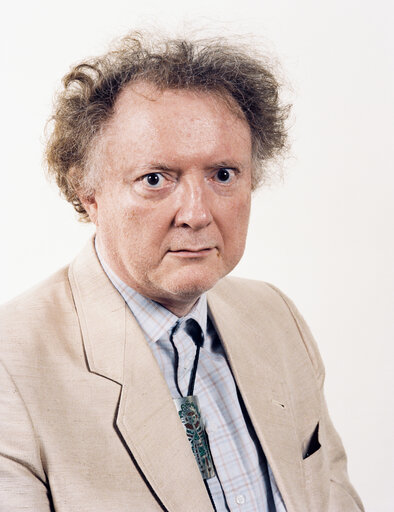
- Born: 11 July 1931; Turin, Italy
- Died: 23 October 2014 (aged 83); Orbassano, Italy
- Education: University of Turin
- Known for: Regge theory; Regge calculus; Regge–Wheeler–Zerilli equations
- Awards: Dannie Heineman Prize for Mathematical Physics (1964); Albert Einstein Award (1979); Pomeranchuk Prize (2001)
- Scientific career
- Fields: Theoretical physics
- Workplaces: Max Planck Institute for Physics; University of Turin; Institute for Advanced Study; Polytechnic University of Turin
- Doctoral advisor: Robert Marshak

Tullio Eugenio Regge (Italian: [ˈtulljo ˈrɛddʒe]; 11 July 1931 – 23 October 2014) was an Italian theoretical physicist.

== Biography ==
Regge obtained the laurea in physics from the University of Turin in 1952 under the direction of Mario Verde and Gleb Wataghin, and a PhD in physics from the University of Rochester in 1957 under the direction of Robert Marshak. From 1958 to 1959 Regge held a post at the Max Planck Institute for Physics where he worked with Werner Heisenberg. In 1961 he was appointed to the chair of Relativity at the University of Turin. He also held an appointment at the Institute for Advanced Study from 1965 to 1979. He was an emeritus professor at the Polytechnic University of Turin while contributing work at CERN as a visiting scientist. Regge died on 23 October 2014. He was married to Rosanna Cester, physicist, by whom he had three children: Daniele, Marta and Anna.

In 1959, Regge discovered a mathematical property of potential scattering in the Schrödinger equation—that the scattering amplitude can be thought of as an analytic function of the angular momentum, and that the position of the poles determines power-law growth rates of the amplitude in the purely mathematical region of large values of the cosine of the scattering angle (i.e. $\cos(\theta)\rightarrow \infty$, requiring complex angles). This formulation is known as Regge theory.

In the early 1960s, Regge introduced Regge calculus, a simplicial formulation of general relativity. Regge calculus was the first discrete gauge theory suitable for numerical simulation, and an early relative of lattice gauge theory. In 1968 he and G. Ponzano developed a quantum version of Regge calculus in three space-time dimensions now known as the Ponzano-Regge model. This was the first of a whole series of state sum models for quantum gravity known as spin foam models. In mathematics, the model also developed into the Turaev-Viro model, an example of a quantum invariant.

In the mid-1960s he was approached by Radical period furniture manufacturer Gufram, for whom he "transformed a mathematical quartic function into a volume with intentionally ergonomic characteristics" to create the design for his 1968 Detecma seat.

Married to the physicist Rosanna Cester, whom he met in the USA in 1954, the couple had three children, Daniele, Marta and Anna.

He died at the San Luigi hospital in Orbassano on 23 October 2014 at the age of 83 due to complications from pneumonia. The civil funeral rite took place in the Farewell Hall of the Monumental Cemetery of Turin, where the body was cremated.

Along with Piero Angela, in 1990 he co-founded the CICAP, covering the role of scientific senior consultant in place of Edoardo Amaldi.

According to his daughter Anna, Tullio Regge spoke seven languages: English, German, French, Spanish, Russian and Hebrew because he would like to read the Bible in its original language, while discussing with the Jehovah Witnesses.

He is considered to be the most influential Italian physicist of the 20th century, after Enrico Fermi.

== Thought ==
He had shared the hypothesis (without affirming it) that "the laws of nature that we discover, or believe we discover, are actually an 'emergent property' of the Universe, that is, they do not exist from the beginning as objective rules that are progressively revealed by us, but instead derive from a self-organizing Chaos."

== Awards and honours ==
He received the Dannie Heineman Prize for Mathematical Physics in 1964, the Città di Como prize in 1968, the Albert Einstein Award in 1979, and the Cecil Powell Medal in 1987.

Regge was elected to the American Philosophical Society in 1982.

In 1989, Regge was elected to the European Parliament as a candidate of the Italian Communist Party and served until 1994. Regge served as president of the Turin section of the Association for Research in Handicap Prevention (AIRH).

He was awarded the Dirac Medal in 1996, the Marcel Grossmann Award in 1997, and the Pomeranchuk Prize in 2001. The asteroid 3778 Regge has been named after him.

Regge theory, a theory of strong interaction phenomenology at high energies, and Regge calculus are named after him.

== Selected works ==
- Lettera ai giovani sulla scienza, Rizzoli, 2004
- Spazio, tempo e universo. Passato, presente e futuro della teoria della relatività, with Giulio Peruzzi, UTET Libreria, 2003
- L'universo senza fine. Breve storia del Tutto: passato e futuro del cosmo, Milan, Mondadori, 1999
- Non abbiate paura. Racconti di fantascienza, La Stampa, 1999
- Infinito, Mondadori, 1996
- Gli eredi di Prometeo. L'energia nel futuro, La Stampa, 1993
- Le meraviglie del reale, La Stampa, 1987
- Dialogo, with Primo Levi, Einaudi, 1987
- Cronache Dell'Universo, Boringhieri, 1981

Main works;;;

- T. Regge, J.A. Wheeler, ”Stability of a Schwarzschild Singularity“, Physical Review, 108 (4) (1957) pp. 1063–1069.
- T. Regge, ”Introduction to complex orbital momenta“, Il Nuovo Cimento, Nuova Serie, 14 (5) (1959) pp. 951–976.
- T. Regge, ”General relativity without coordinates“, Il Nuovo Cimento, Nuova Serie, 19 (3) (1961) pp. 558–571.
- A. Bottino, A.M. Longoni, T. Regge, ”Potential Scattering for Complex Energy and Angular Momentum“, Il Nuovo Cimento, 23 (6) (1962) pp. 954–1004.

== Sources ==
- Leonardo Castellani, Anna Ceresole, Riccardo D'Auria, Pietro Frè (Edited by), Tullio Regge: An Eclectic Genius. From Quantum Gravity to Computer Play, World Scientific, Singapore, 2020.
- Pietro Frè (3 September 2016). "Biographic Memories" (PDF). Proceedings of the American Philosophical Society. 160 (3). Archived from the original (PDF) on 21 January 2022.
