= Glossary of string theory =

This page is a glossary of terms in string theory, including related areas such as supergravity, supersymmetry, and high energy physics.

== Conventions ==
-bein
A suffix indicating a frame, where the first part is a German word indicating the dimension (as in zweibein, vierbein, and so on).
-ino
The superpartners of bosons are often denoted by the suffix -ino; for example, photon/photino.
s-
The superpartners of fermions are often denoted by adding s- at the beginning; for example, quark/squark.

== αβγ ==
α
1. Fine-structure constant
2. Regge slope, or inverse of the string tension
How are these related? There is only one dimensional constant in string theory, and that is the inverse string tension $\alpha^{\prime}$ with units of area. Sometimes $\alpha^{\prime}$ is therefore replaced by a length $l_s=\sqrt{\alpha^{\prime}}$. The string tension is mostly defined as the fraction

$$\frac{1}{2\pi\alpha^{\prime}}.$$

Tension is energy or work per unit length. In natural units $c=1$ and $\hbar=1$, and hence $\alpha^{\prime}$ has dimension of length/energy or length/mass. Since $\hbar$ has the dimension of action, i.e. momentum times length, it follows that in natural units mass =1/length, and so $\alpha^{\prime}$ has the unit of area. The slope $\alpha^{\prime}$ of a Regge trajectory $\alpha(M^2)$ in Regge theory is the derivative of spin $S$ or angular momentum with respect to mass-squared, i.e.

$$\frac{dS}{dM^2}.$$

Since angular momentum is moment of momentum $p$, i.e. length times mass with $c=1$, $S$ is dimensionless in natural units, and $\alpha^{\prime}$ has units of $1/M^2$ or area like the inverse string tension.

3. A Fourier coefficient of a spacetime coordinate.
4. α_{s} is the strong coupling constant
β
1. One of the two conformal superghost fields β, γ used in the BRST quantization of the superstring
2. Euler beta function
3. Beta function describing the change of coupling constant under the renormalization group flow
γ
1. Dirac matrix
2. One of the two conformal superghost fields β, γ used in the BRST quantization of the superstring
3. World-sheet metric γ_{ab}(σ,τ)
4. Photon
5. Euler constant .57721...
Γ
1. Lattice
2. Euler Gamma function
3. Dirac matrix
4. Width of some scattering process
δ
1. Kronecker delta function
2. An infinitesimal change in something; for example δL is an infinitesimal change in L
Δ
1. Propagator
2. Delta baryon, a baryon with 3 light quarks and isospin 3/2
3. Laplace operator in Euclidean space or more generally a Riemannian manifold
ε
1. Small positive real number
2. Antisymmetric tensor
η
1. Flat Lorentzian metric on spacetime
2. Dedekind eta function, a weight 1/2 modular form
3. Eta meson, a neutral flavor meson with PC = –+
θ
1. Theta function
2. θ_{c} is the Cabbibo angle
3. θ_{w} is the Weinberg angle, also called the weak mixing angle
Λ
1. Cosmological constant
2. Large energy or large mass cutoff in regularization
3. Lambda baryon, a baryon with 2 light quarks and isospin 0
μ
1. Renormalization scale, with the dimensions of mass
2. Muon
ν
Neutrino
Ξ
1. Xi baryon, a baryon with 1 light quark
π
1. 3.14159...
2. Pion
Π
The momentum density conjugate to X
ρ
Rho meson, a light meson with PC = ––
σ
1. Spacelike coordinate on the world-sheet
2. Scattering cross section
3. Pauli matrix
4. See #sigma model
Σ
1. Sigma baryon, a baryon with 2 light quarks and isospin 1
τ
1. Timelike coordinate on the world-sheet
2. Element of the upper half plane
3. Tauon
Υ
Upsilon meson (bb̅)
φ
Scalar field
χ
Neutral-flavor heavy meson with PC = ++
ψ
1. Spinor field
2. Psi meson (cc̅)
Ω
1. Density of something in the universe; for example, Ω_{ν} is the neutrino density
2. Omega baryon, a baryon with no light quarks

== !$@ ==
' (prime)
X′ means ∂X/∂σ.
dot above letter
Ẋ means ∂X/∂τ
∇
1. A covariant derivative
2. The del operator.
□
The D'Alembert operator, or non-Euclidean Laplacian.
[,]
A commutator: [A,B] = AB–BA.
{,}
An anticommutator: {A,B} = AB+BA.

== A ==
A
1. A connection 1-form
2. Short for antiperiodic, a boundary condition on strings.
3. Short for axial vector
4. An asymmetry
action
A function S on the space of fields given (formally) by the integral of the Lagrangian density over spacetime, whose stationary points are the solutions of the equations of motion.
ADE
Refers to the ADE classification (A_{n},D_{n}, E_{6}, E_{7}, E_{8}) of simply laced Dynkin diagrams, and to several related classifications of Lie algebras, singularities and so on.
ADHM
Initials of Atiyah, Drinfeld, Hitchin, and Manin, as in the ADHM construction of instantons.
ADM
Initials of Arnowitt, Deser, and Misner, as in ADM energy, a way of defining the global energy in an asymptotically flat spacetime, or ADM decomposition of a metric, or ADM formalism.
AdS
Anti-de Sitter, as in anti-de Sitter space, a Lorentzian analogue of hyperbolic space.
AdS/CFT
Anti-de Sitter/conformal field theory, especially the AdS/CFT correspondence.
ALE
Asymptotically locally Euclidean
ALEPH
ALEPH experiment at LEP
AMSB
Anomaly mediation supersymmetry breaking
ASD
Anti self-dual (connection)
ATLAS
The ATLAS experiment at CERN, a particle detector.
axino
A hypothetical supersymmetric partner of an axion.
axion
A hypothetical scalar particle whose mass arises from a coupling rather than from a mass term in the Lagrangian, used to resolve the strong CP problem.

== B ==
b
1. One of the two conformal ghost fields b, c used in the BRST quantization of the bosonic string.
2. A bottom quark.
B
1. Baryon number.
2. Short for boson.
3. Short for baryon.
4. Short for backward;for example, σ_{B} is the cross section for backward scattering.
5. A bottom meson.
BAO
Baryon acoustic oscillation
BB
Big Bang
BBN
Big Bang nucleosynthesis
bino
A hypothetical supersymmetric partner of the gauge field corresponding to weak hypercharge.
BIon
A BPS solution representing an infinite string ending on a D-brane. Named after the Born–Infeld action.
BPS
A state related to the Bogomol'nyi–Prasad–Sommerfield bound.
BR
Branching ratio
BRS
BRST quantization
Short for Becchi, Rouet, Stora and Tyutin, who introduced the BRST quantization of gauge theories.
brane
Short for membrane. a higher-dimensional manifold moving in spacetime. See also p-brane, D-brane.
BTZ
Initials of Bañados–Teitelboim–Zanelli, as in BTZ black hole, a black hole in 2+1-dimensional gravity.
BV
Batalin–Vilkovisky, as in Batalin–Vilkovisky formalism.

== C ==
c
1. The speed of light, when not using units where this is 1.
2. A central charge of the Virasoro algebra or similar algebra.
3. One of the two conformal ghost fields b, c used in the BRST quantization of the bosonic string.
4. A Chern class.
5. A charm quark.
C
1. Charge, especially the charge symmetry.
Calabi–Yau
A Kähler manifold with vanishing Ricci curvature, used for compactifying string theories.
CAR
Canonical anticommutation relations
CBR
Cosmic background radiation
CC
1. Charged current (weak interaction).
2. Complex conjugate
3. Compatibility condition
CCR
Canonical commutation relation
CCR and CAR algebras
CDF
Collider Detector at Fermilab
CDM
Cold dark matter
CERN
Conseil Européen pour la Recherche Nucléaire
chargino
A hypothetical charged supersymmetric partner of a gauge boson.
Chern–Simons
1. Chern–Simons theory
2. Chern–Simons form
chiral
1. Not invariant under the parity symmetry. The word comes from the Greek χειρ meaning "hand"; the terms "left-handed" and "right-handed" are often used to describe chiral objects.
2. A chiral multiplet is a type of supermutliplet of a supersymmetry algebra.
CIPT
Contour improved perturbation theory
CKG
Short for conformal Killing group.
CKM
The Cabibbo–Kobayashi–Maskawa matrix.
CKS
Short for conformal Killing spinor.
CKV
Short for conformal Killing vector.
CFT
Conformal field theory
Chan–Paton
A Chan–Paton charge is a degree of freedom carried by an open string on its endpoints.
cl
1. Short for classical (for example, S_{cl} is the classical action).
2. CL is short for confidence limit.
closed
A closed string is one with no ends.
CM
Center of mass (frame)
CMB
CMBR
Cosmic microwave background radiation
CMS
1. The Compact Muon Solenoid at CERN, a particle detector.
2. Short for the Center-of-Momentum System, a coordinate system where the total momentum is 0.
compactification
A method for reducing the apparent dimension of spacetime by wrapping the string around a compact manifold.
cosmological constant
The constant term of the Lagrangian, inducing a term in the action proportional to the volume of spacetime
CP
Short for Charge–Parity, as in CP symmetry.
CPC
Short for Charge–Parity conservation.
CPT
Short for Charge–Parity–Time, as in CPT symmetry or CPT theorem.
CPV
Short for Charge–Parity violation.
critical
The critical dimension is the spacetime dimension in which a string or superstring theory is consistent; usually 26 for string theories and 10 for superstring theories.
CVC
Conserved vector current.
CY
Short for Calabi–Yau, as in Calabi–Yau manifold, a Ricci-flat Kähler manifold, often used for compactifying superstring theories.

== D ==
d
1. The exterior derivative of a form.
2. A down quark.
3. The dimension of spacetime.
D
1. Short for Dirichlet, as in D-brane
2. The dimension of spacetime
3. A connection or differential operator
4. A Dynkin diagram of an orthogonal group in even dimensions.
5. A charmed meson.
D0
D-brane
Dp-brane
Short for Dirichlet (mem)brane, a submanifold (of dimension p+1) on which the ends of strings are constrained to lie, so that the strings satisfy Dirichlet boundary conditions.
D-string
A D1-brane
DBI
Short for Dirac–Born–Infeld, as in the DBI action, an action based on the Born–Infeld action, a modification of the Maxwell action of electrodynamics.
DDF
Initials of Del Guidice, Di Vecchia, and Fubini, as in Del Guidice–Di Vecchia–Fubini operator, operators generating an oscillator algebra.
DELPHI
DELPHI experiment at LEP.
DESY
Deutsches Elektronen-Synchrotron
DGLAP
Initials of Dokshitzer–Gribov–Lipatov–Altarelli–Parisi who introduced the DGLAP evolution equation in QCD.
Diff
Diffeomorphism or diffeomorphism group.
dilatino
A supersymmetric partner of the dilaton.
dilaton
A massless scalar particle, related to dilations of spacetime.
Dirichlet
Dirichlet boundary conditions on an open string say that the ends of the string are fixed (often lying on a D-brane).
DIS
Deep inelastic scattering
DLCQ
Discrete light-cone quantization
DM
Dark matter
DØ
Dp-brane
Short for Dirichlet (mem)brane, a submanifold (of dimension p+1) on which the ends of strings are constrained to lie, so that the strings satisfy Dirichlet boundary conditions.
DR
1. Short for dimensional regularization.
2. Short for dimensional reduction, a way of constructing theories from simpler theories in higher dimensions, sometimes by making fields invariant under some spacelike translations.
dS
de Sitter, as in de Sitter space, a Lorentzian analogue of a sphere
dS/CFT
de Sitter/conformal field theory, especially the dS/CFT correspondence.
dual resonance model
An early precursor of string theory.
duality
A hidden connection between two different theories, such as S-duality, T-duality, U-duality, mysterious duality.
DY
Initials of Drell–Yan, as in DY process.
dyon
A hypothetical particle with both electrical and magnetic charge.

== E ==
e
1. Euler's constant
2. A frame
3. An electron
E
Energy
E6
E_{6} is the exceptional Lie algebra of rank 6 and dimension 78.
E7
E_{7} the exceptional Lie algebra of rank 7 and dimension 133.
E8
E_{8} the exceptional Lie algebra of rank 8 and dimension 248.
eff
Short for effective (field theory).
EFT
Effective field theory, a low-energy approximation to a theory.
einbein
A frame in 1 dimension
elfbein
A frame in 11 dimensions
energy–momentum tensor
A symmetric tensor T (also called the stress-energy tensor) describing the variation of the action under changes in the metric, whose components give the local energy, momentum and stress densities. In flat spacetimes it can also be given by combining the Noether currents of the translation symmetries.
EWSB
Electro-weak symmetry breaking.

== F ==
F
1. A curvature form of a connection
2. The world-sheet fermion number.
3. Short for fermion
3. Short for forward;for example, σ_{F} is the cross section for backward scattering.
F4
F_{4} is the exceptional Lie algebra of rank 4 and dimension 52.
FCNC
Flavor-changing neutral current.
field
A section of a fiber bundle
FOPT
Fixed-order perturbation theory.
F-string
Fundamental string
F-theory
Possibly an abbreviation of father theory. A 12-dimensional string theory introduced by Vafa.
FRW
Friedman–Robertson–Walker metric on spacetime

== G ==
g
1. A metric
2. A coupling constant
3. The genus of a Riemann surface.
4. A gluon.
G
1. Newton's gravitational constant, sometimes written G_{N}.
2. The Fermi coupling constant for weak interactions, sometimes written G_{F}.
3. G_{n} is an odd element of the Ramond or Neveu–Schwarz superalgebra.
G2
The exceptional Lie algebra of rank 2 and dimension 14, or a G2 manifold with G_{2} holonomy.
gaugino
A spin 1/2 supersymmetric partner of a gauge boson.
gh
Abbreviation for ghost; for example, S_{gh} is the ghost action.
ghost
A vector of negative norm.
GKO
Short for Goddard–Kent–Olive. The GKO construction, also called the coset construction, is a way of constructing unitary discrete series representations of the Virasoro algebra.
GL
A general linear group.
gluino
A hypothetical supersymmetric partner of a gluon.
gluon
A gauge boson associated with the strong force.
GMSB
Gauge mediated supersymmetry breaking.
goldstino
A massless spin 1/2 particle associated with spontaneous breakdown of supersymmetry, analogous to the Goldstone boson.
GR
General relativity
graviton
A conjectural spin 2 massless particle responsible for gravity.
gravitino
A supersymmetric partner of the graviton.
Green
Named for Michael Green.
GS
Green–Schwarz formalism, a way of incorporating supersymmetry into string theory that is supersymmetric in 10-dimensional spacetime.
GSO
Short for Ferdinando Gliozzi, Joël Scherk, and David A. Olive, as in the GSO projection, a projection in superstring theory that eliminates tachyons.
GSW
The 2-volume work on superstring theory by Green, Schwarz, and Witten.
GUT
Grand Unified Theory, a hypothetical theory unifying the strong and electroweak forces.
GWS
Glashow–Weinberg–Salem theory of the electroweak force.
GZK
The Greisen–Zatsepin–Kuzmin limit on the energy of cosmic background radiation from distant sources.

== H ==
h
1. The weight of a field (for example, its eigenvalue for L_{0}).
2. Hermitian; for example, h.c. stands form hermitian conjugate.
H
1. The Hamiltonian.
2. The Higgs boson.
3. The Hubble constant.
Haag–Łopuszański–Sohnius theorem
A theorem describing the possible supersymmetries of a quantum field theory, generalizing the Coleman–Mandula theorem.
Hagedorn temperature
The temperature above which the partition function diverges due to the exponentially increasing number of string states.
h.c.
hc
Hermitian conjugate
HCMS
Hadronic center of mass (frame)
HDM
Higgs doublet model
HE
Short for heterotic-E^{2}_{8}, a heterotic string theory based on the group E^{2}_{8}.
helicity
The projection of the spin of a massless particle in the direction of its momentum.
HERA
Hadron Elektron Ring Anlage
heterotic
Named after the Greek word heterosis, meaning hybrid vigour. A hybrid of bosonic string theory and superstring theory, introduced by David Gross, Jeffrey Harvey, Emil Martinec, and Ryan Rohm in 1985.
Higgs boson
A massive scalar particle related to the spontaneous symmetry breaking mechanism in the electroweak theory.
Higgsino
A hypothetical supersymmetric partner of a Higgs boson.
HO
Short for heterotic-orthogonal, a heterotic string theory based on the orthogonal group O_{32}(R).
holographic principle
HQET
Hyperkähler
Hyperkaehler
A Riemannian manifold with holonomy contained in the compact form of the symplectic group.
Hypermultiplet
A type of supermultiplet (representation) of an extended supersymmetry algebra.

== I ==
i
√–1
I
Isospin.
IGM
Intergalactic medium
inflation
A hypothetical very rapid increase in the size of the very early universe.
instanton
A self-dual or anti-self-dual connection in a principal bundle over a four-dimensional Riemannian manifold.
int
Short for interaction; for example, H_{int} might be an interaction Hamiltonian.
inv
Short for invisible; for example, Γ_{inv} is the width for invisible decays (those unobseverd by an experiment).

== J ==
J
1. A current
2. A source
3. Spin.

== K ==
k
A momentum
K
A kaon (a strange meson).
K3
A simply connected compact complex surface of Kodaira dimension 0
K-theory
A cohomology theory based on vector bundles.
Kac–Moody algebra
A central extension of a loop algebra.
Kähler
Kaehler
Named after Erich Kähler
1. A Kähler manifold is a complex manifold with a compatible Riemannian metric.
2. A Kähler metric is the metric on a Kähler manifold.
3. A Kähler potential is a function of superfields used to construct a Lagrangian.
Kalb–Ramond field
KK
Kaluza–Klein
KM
1. The Kobayashi–Maskawa mechanism for CP violation.
2. Kac–Moody algebra.
KZ
Initials of Knizhnik and Zamolodchikov, as in KZ equation, a differential equation related to the primary fields of a current algebra.

== L ==
L
1. A Lagrangian.
2. L_{n} is an element of the Virasoro algebra.
3. An abbreviation for left (moving modes).
4. Lepton number.
5. Short for lepton.
L3
L3 experiment at LEP.
Lagrangian (field theory)
A function on the jet space of a fiber bundle.
landscape
The (conjectural) moduli space of all (vacuums of) string theories.
LEP
The Large Electron–Positron Collider at CERN.
lepton
An elementary particle of spin 1/2 that is unaffected by the strong force.
LH
Left-handed
LHC
The Large Hadron Collider at CERN.
little string theory
LL
Double logarithmic
LO
Leading order (term)
LQG
Loop quantum gravity
LQC
Loop quantum cosmology
LSP
Abbreviation for lightest supersymmetric particle.
LSS
Large scale structure (of the universe).

== M ==
m
A mass of a fermion. For example, m_{t} is the mass of the top quark t.
M
The mass of a boson; for example, M_{Z} is the mass of the Z-boson.
Majorana fermion
Majorana spinor
A fermion or spinor with a reality condition, in spacetimes of dimension 2, 3, 4 mod 8.
Majorana–Weyl fermion
Majorana–Weyl spinor
A half-spinor with a reality condition, in spacetimes of dimension 2 mod 8.
Mandelstam variable
A sum or difference of two of the four incoming or outgoing momenta of a 2-particle interaction.
matrix theory
M(atrix) theory
One of several non-perturbative formulations of string theory or M-theory using infinite matrices.
M-brane
membrane
A higher dimensional analogue of a string.
MC
Monte Carlo integration
MCG
minimal model
Certain solvable conformal field theories.
Mirror symmetry (string theory)
A partly conjectural relation between a type IIA superstring theory compactified on a Calabi–Yau manifold and a type IIB superstring theory compactified on a different "mirror" Calabi–Yau manifold.
MLLA
Modified leading logarithm approximation.
MNS
Maki–Nakagawa–Sakata matrix for neutrino mixing
monopole
A hypothetical particle similar to a "magnet with only one pole".
Montonen–Olive duality
An early case of S-duality.
MS
minimal subtraction (a renormalization scheme). M̅S̅ is the modified minimal subtraction scheme.
MSM
Abbreviation for minimal standard model.
MSSM
Abbreviation for minimal supersymmetric standard model.
mSUGRA
Minimal model of supergravity.
M-theory
An 11-dimensional theory introduced in the second string theory revolution to unify the 5 known superstring theories. The letter M has been said to stand for membrane, matrix, magic, mystery, monster, and so on.
MSW
Mikheyev–Smirnov–Wolfenstein effect concerning neutrino oscillations in matter.
multiplet
A linear representation of a Lie algebra or group.
A collection of elementary particles corresponding to a basis of a representation.

== N ==
N
1. The number of times each irreducible real spinor representation appears in the fermionic part of a supersymmetry algebra or super Minkowski space. It is often used in the description of an extended supersymmetry algebra, as in N=2 superconformal algebra and so on.
2. A nucleon, a baryon with 3 light quarks and isospin 1/2 (such as a proton or neutron).
3. The number of some type of particle.
Nambu–Goto action
An action for strings, proportional to the area of the worldsheet.
NC
Neutral current (weak interaction).
Neumann
Neumann boundary conditions on an open string say that the momentum normal to the boundary of the world-sheet is zero.
neutralino
A hypothetical supersymmetric partner of a gauge boson with zero charge.
Neveu
Named for André Neveu.
Neveu–Schwarz algebra
A supersymmetric extension of the Virasoro algebra, similar to the Ramond algebra.
NG
1. Short for Nambu–Goto, as in Nambu–Goto action.
2. Short for Nambu–Goldstone, as in Nambu–Goldstone boson.
NLL
Next to leading logarithmic (term).
NLO
Next to leading order (term).
NLSP
next-to-lightest sypersymmetric particle
NMSSM
Next-to-Minimal Supersymmetric Standard Model.
NNLL
Next to next to leading logarithmic (term).
NNLO
Next to next to leading order (term).
NNNLL
Next to next to next to leading logarithmic (term).
no-ghost theorem
A theorem stating that some hermitian form is positive semidefinite, in other words has no ghosts (negative norm vectors). The name is a word-play on no-go theorem.
NR
Non-relativistic
NRQCD
Non-relativistic quantum chromodynamics
NS
Neveu–Schwarz, especially the Neveu–Schwarz algebra
NS–NS
A sector with Neveu–Schwarz conditions on left and right moving modes.
NS–R
A sector with Neveu–Schwarz conditions on left moving modes and Ramond conditions on right moving modes.
NUT
The initials of E. Newman, L. Tamburino, and T. Unti, mainly used in Taub–NUT vacuum, a solution to Einsteins' equations.

== O ==
O
An orthogonal group
OCQ
Short for old covariant quantization
OPAL
The OPAL detector at LEP.
open
An open string is one with two ends.
OPE
operator product expansion
A description of short-distance singularities of fields.
orbifold
Something that looks locally like a manifold quotiented by the action of a finite group.
OSp
A Lie superalgebra.

== P ==
p
A momentum
P
1. Parity, especially the parity symmetry.
2. Short for periodic, a boundary condition on strings (as opposed to A for antiperiodic).
3. Pseudoscalar (current)
4. Momentum
5. One of the bosonic elements of a supersymmetry algebra.
p-brane
A p+1 dimensional membrane, where p is a non-negative integer. The dimension of membranes is often given by their space dimension, which is 1 less than their full spacetime dimension.
PCAC
partially conserved axial vector current
PDF
Parton distribution function.
PDG
Particle Data Group.
photino
A hypothetical supersymmetric partner of the photon.
photon
The neutral spin 1 gauge boson of the electromagnetic field.
PMNS
Pontecorvo–Maki–Nakagawa–Sakata matrix for neutrino mixing
Polyakov action
A modification of the Nambu–Goto action for strings that eliminates the square root.
PQ
Peccei–Quinn, as in Peccei–Quinn theory.
pQCD
PQCD
Perturbative quantum chromodynamics.
prepotential
A function used to construct the vector superfield in supersymmetric gauge theory and Seiberg–Witten theory.
primary field
A field killed by the positive weight operators of the Virasoro algebra (or similar algebra); in other words, a lowest weight vector.
Princeton string quartet
David Gross, Jeffrey Harvey, Emil Martinec, and Ryan Rohm, who introduced the heterotic string in 1985.
PSL
Projective special linear group.

== Q ==
q
A quark.
Q
1. The BRST operator.
2. A charge
3. One of the fermionic generators of a supersymmetry algebra.
quark
A strongly interacting elementary particle of spin 1/2.
QCD
QED

== R ==
R
1. Short for Ramond, as in Ramond sector.
2. A curvature tensor
3. An abbreviation for right (moving modes).
4. A radius
5. R-symmetry is a symmetry of extended supersymmetry algebras.
Ramond
Named for Pierre Ramond.
Ramond algebra
A supersymmetric extension of the Virasoro algebra, similar to the Neveu–Schwarz algebra.
Rarita–Schwinger
Refers to spin 3/2 fermions.
Regge
1. Physicist Tullio Regge.
2. Regge trajectory: the squared mass of a hadronic resonance is roughly linear in the spin, with the constant of proportionality called the Regge slope.
revolution
Any new idea in string theory. In particular the first superstring revolution refers to the discoveries in the mid 1980s such as the cancellation of gravitational anomalies and the heterotic string, and the second superstring revolution refers to the discoveries in the mid 1990s, such as D-branes, M-theory, and matrix theory and the AdS/CFT correspondence.
RG
Renormalization group.
RGE
Renormalization group equation.
RH
Right-handed
R–NS
A sector with Ramond conditions on left moving modes and Neveu–Schwarz conditions on right moving modes.
RNS
Ramond–Neveu–Schwarz, as in RNS formalism, a way of incorporating supersymmetry into string theory that is supersymmetric on the world sheet.
R-parity
A Z_{2} symmetry of supersymmetric models.
R-R
Short for Ramond–Ramond sector

== S ==
s
1. A strange quark.
2. A Mandelstam variable
S
1. An action
2. A scattering matrix.
3. The transformation τ → –1/τ of the upper half plane
4. Scalar (current)
5. Short for super or supersymmetric
S-brane
A brane similar to a D-brane, with Dirichlet boundary conditions in the time direction.
S-duality
Strong–weak duality, a string duality relating theories with a large coupling constant to theories with a small coupling constant
SBB
Standard Big Bang model of the universe
SCFT
Superconformal field theory, a supersymmetric extension of conformal field theory
Schwarz
Named for John Henry Schwarz
Seiberg duality
SGA
Abbreviation for Spectrum-generating algebra
short supermultiplet
A supermultiplet (representation) related to BPS states
sigma model
A classical or quantum model based on the maps from a base manifold to a target manifold.
SL
Special linear group
SLAC
Stanford Linear Accelerator Center
SLC
Stanford Linear Collider
slepton
Hypothetical supersymmetric partner of a lepton
SM
sneutrino
Hypothetical supersymmetric partner of a neutrino
SO
Special orthogonal group
Sp
Symplectic group
sphaleron
Static solution to the electroweak field equations
squark
Supersymmetric partner of a quark.
SSB
Spontaneous symmetry breaking
SSM
Standard solar model
stress–energy tensor
Alternative name for the #energy–momentum tensor.
string field theory
SU
Special unitary group
SUGRA
Short for supergravity
superconformal algebra
A supersymmetric analogue of the Virasoro algebra of conformal symmetries in 2 dimensions
superfield
A supersymmetric analogue of a quantum or classical field
supergravity
A supersymmetric extension of general relativity
supermultiplet
A representation of a supersymmetry algebra
superpotential
A function of chiral superfield not depending on their superderivatives or spacetime derivatives, used to form a Lagrangian.
superspace
A supersymmetric analogue of spacetime
superstring
A supersymmetric analogue of a string
supersymmetry
A generalization of a Lie superalgebra, where the Lie bracket [a,b] is sometimes given by ab+ba rather than ab–ba.
SUSY
An abbreviation for supersymmetry.
SYM
Supersymmetric Yang–Mills

== T ==
t
1. A top quark.
2. A Mandelstam variable.
3. Time.
T
1. The energy–momentum tensor.
2. Time, especially the time symmetry.
3. The transformation τ → τ+1 of the upper half plane.
4. A torus.
5. The string tension.
6. Temperature.
7. Tensor (current)
T-duality
A string duality relating theories on a large spacetime to theories on a small spacetime. In particular it exchanges type IIA and IIB superstring theory.
tachyon
A particle of imaginary mass moving faster than light.
ToE
TOE
Theory of everything
type I
type II
type IIA
type IIB
A type of superstring or the corresponding low-energy supergravity theory. The Roman numeral I or II refers to the number of d=10 supersymmetries, and types IIA or IIB are distinguished by whether the supersymmetries of left and right movers have opposite or identical chiralities.

== U ==
u
1. An up quark.
2. A Mandelstam variable.
U
A unitary group.
U-duality
Short for "unified duality". A string duality relating two different string theories.
UED
Universal extra dimensions
UV
Short for ultra-violet, often referring to short-distance singularities.

== V ==
V
1. A vertex operator.
2. Vector (current)
V-A
Vector-Axial vector
vector superfield
A type of superfield related to vector supermultiplets.
VEV
Vacuum expectation value of an operator.
vielbein
A frame
vierbein
A frame in 4 dimensions. Sometimes used for a frame in an arbitrary number of dimension by authors who do not care that "vier" means four in German.
Veneziano amplitude
The Euler beta function interpreted as a scattering amplitude.
vertex operator
Virasoro algebra
A central extension of the Witt algebra of polynomial vector fields on a circle.

== W ==
w
A complex number
W
A W-boson
W-algebra
A sort of generalization of the Virasoro algebra
Weyl
1. Named after Hermann Weyl
2. A Weyl transformation is a rescaling of the world-sheet metric.
3. Weyl spinor, an element of a half-spin representation in even spacetime dimensions.
WIMP
Weakly interacting massive particle
wino
A hypothetical supersymmetric partner of the W-boson.
Witten
Named for Edward Witten.
WMAP
Wilkinson Microwave Anisotropy Probe
world sheet
The 2-dimensional subset of spacetime swept out by a moving string.
world-volume
The p+1-dimensional spacetime volume swept out by a p-brane, as in world-volume action.
WZNW
WZW
Initials of Wess, Zumino, (Novikov), and Witten, as in the WZW model, a σ-model with a group as the target space.

== XYZ ==
x
A real number
X
Used for coordinates in Minkowski space.
y
A real number
YBE
Yang–Baxter equation
YM
Yang–Mills
z
A complex number
Z
1. A partition function
2. The Z boson.
An element of the center of an extended supersymmetry algebra.
ZEUS
zino
A hypothetical supersymmetric partner of the Z-boson.
zweibein
A frame in 2 dimensions

== See also ==
- List of string theory topics
