= String duality =

Class of symmetries in string theory

String duality is a class of symmetries in physics that link different string theories, theories which assume that the fundamental building blocks of the universe are strings instead of point particles.

== Overview ==
In the mid-1990s, a breakthrough known as the second superstring revolution revealed that the five distinct superstring theories developed earlier were not separate theories at all. Previously, physicists had developed five consistent versions of superstring theory: type I, types IIA and IIB, and two heterotic string theories. The prevailing thought was that only one of these could be the correct theory of everything.

It is now understood that these are all different limiting cases of a single, more fundamental 11-dimensional theory, dubbed M-theory. The relationships between these theories are called dualities. When two theories are related by a duality, it means they are mathematically different descriptions of the same underlying phenomena. Each observable quantity in one theory can be mapped to a quantity in the other theory, yielding identical physical predictions. A simple example of a duality is the equivalence of describing the universe using matter versus using antimatter; both descriptions would lead to the same physical laws and experimental outcomes.

String dualities are powerful because they often connect quantities that appear to be very different. For example, some dualities link theories at large distance scales to theories at small distance scales, or theories with strong forces (a high coupling constant) to theories with weak forces. In classical physics and quantum field theory, these are very distinct limits. String theory, however, can obscure the difference between large and small, or strong and weak, which is how these five seemingly different theories are ultimately related.

The five superstring theories before the duality revolution
Type	Spacetime dimensions	Key characteristics
I	10	Contains both open and closed strings; group symmetry is SO(32).
IIA	10	Contains closed strings, with open strings ending on D-branes; massless fermions are non-chiral.
IIB	10	Contains closed strings, with open strings ending on D-branes; massless fermions are chiral.
HO	10	Contains only closed strings; heterotic, with group symmetry SO(32).
HE	10	Contains only closed strings; heterotic, with group symmetry E_{8}×E_{8}.

== T-duality ==
Suppose we are in ten spacetime dimensions, which means we have nine space dimensions and one time. Take one of those nine space dimensions and make it a circle of radius R, so that traveling in that direction for a distance L = 2πR takes you around the circle and brings you back to where you started. A particle traveling around this circle will have a quantized momentum around the circle, because its momentum is linked to its wavelength (see wave–particle duality), and 2πR must be a multiple of that. In fact, the particle momentum around the circle - and the contribution to its energy - is of the form n/R (in standard units, for an integer n), so that at large R there will be many more states compared to small R (for a given maximum energy). A string, in addition to traveling around the circle, may also wrap around it. The number of times the string winds around the circle is called the winding number, and that is also quantized (as it must be an integer). Winding around the circle requires energy, because the string must be stretched against its tension, so it contributes an amount of energy of the form $wR/L_{st}^2$, where $L_{st}$ is a constant called the string length and w is the winding number (an integer). Now (for a given maximum energy) there will be many different states (with different momenta) at large R, but there will also be many different states (with different windings) at small R. In fact, a theory with large R and a theory with small R are equivalent, where the role of momentum in the first is played by the winding in the second, and vice versa. Mathematically, taking R to $L_{st}^2/R$ and switching n and w will yield the same equations. So exchanging momentum and winding modes of the string exchanges a large distance scale with a small distance scale.

This type of duality is called T-duality. T-duality relates type IIA superstring theory to type IIB superstring theory. That means if we take type IIA and Type IIB theory and compactify them both on a circle (one with a large radius and the other with a small radius) then switching the momentum and winding modes, and switching the distance scale, changes one theory into the other. The same is also true for the two heterotic theories. T-duality also relates type I superstring theory to both type IIA and type IIB superstring theories with certain boundary conditions (termed orientifold).

Formally, the location of the string on the circle is described by two fields living on it, one which is left-moving and another which is right-moving. The movement of the string center (and hence its momentum) is related to the sum of the fields, while the string stretch (and hence its winding number) is related to their difference. T-duality can be formally described by taking the left-moving field to minus itself, so that the sum and the difference are interchanged, leading to switching of momentum and winding.

== S-duality ==
Every force has a coupling constant, which is a measure of its strength, and determines the chances of one particle to emit or absorb another particle. For electromagnetism, the coupling constant is proportional to the square of the electric charge. When physicists study the quantum behavior of electromagnetism, they can't solve the whole theory exactly, because every particle may emit and absorb many other particles, which may also do the same, endlessly. So events of emission and absorption are considered as perturbations and are dealt with by a series of approximations, first assuming there is only one such event, then correcting the result for allowing two such events, etc. (this method is called Perturbation theory). This is a reasonable approximation only if the coupling constant is small, which is the case for electromagnetism. But if the coupling constant gets large, that method of calculation breaks down, and the little pieces become worthless as an approximation to the real physics.

This also can happen in string theory. String theories have a coupling constant. But unlike in particle theories, the string coupling constant is not just a number, but depends on one of the oscillation modes of the string, called the dilaton. Exchanging the dilaton field with minus itself exchanges a very large coupling constant with a very small one. This symmetry is called S-duality. If two string theories are related by S-duality, then one theory with a strong coupling constant is the same as the other theory with weak coupling constant. The theory with strong coupling cannot be understood by means of perturbation theory, but the theory with weak coupling can. So if the two theories are related by S-duality, then we just need to understand the weak theory, and that is equivalent to understanding the strong theory.

Superstring theories related by S-duality are: type I superstring theory with heterotic SO(32) superstring theory, and type IIB theory with itself.

Furthermore, type IIA theory in strong coupling behaves like an 11-dimensional theory, with the dilaton field playing the role of an eleventh dimension. This 11-dimensional theory is known as M-theory.

Unlike the T-duality, however, S-duality has not been proven to even a physics level of rigor for any of the aforementioned cases. It remains, strictly speaking, a conjecture, although most string theorists believe in its validity.

== See also ==
- Mirror symmetry
- U-duality
