= F-theory =

Branch of string theory

In theoretical physics, F-theory is a branch of string theory developed by Iranian-American physicist Cumrun Vafa. The new vacua described by F-theory were discovered by Vafa and allowed string theorists to construct new realistic vacua — in the form of F-theory compactified on elliptically fibered Calabi–Yau four-folds. The letter "F" supposedly stands for "Father" in relation to "Mother"-theory.

== Compactifications ==
F-theory is formally a 12-dimensional theory, but the only way to obtain an acceptable background is to compactify this theory on a two-torus. By doing so, one obtains type IIB superstring theory in 10 dimensions. The SL(2,Z) S-duality symmetry of the resulting type IIB string theory is manifest because it arises as the group of large diffeomorphisms of the two-dimensional torus.

More generally, one can compactify F-theory on an elliptically fibered manifold (elliptic fibration), i.e. a fiber bundle whose fiber is a two-dimensional torus (also called an elliptic curve). For example, a subclass of the K3 manifolds is elliptically fibered, and F-theory on a K3 manifold is dual to heterotic string theory on a two-torus. Also, the moduli spaces of those theories should be isomorphic.

The large number of semirealistic solutions to string theory referred to as the string theory landscape may be dominated by F-theory compactifications on Calabi–Yau four-folds, with $10^{272,000}$ elements or so. There are at least $10^{15}$ of those solutions consistent with the Standard Model of particle physics.

== Phenomenology ==
New models of Grand Unified Theory have been developed using F-theory.

== Extra time dimension ==
F-theory has the metric signature (10,2), which means that it includes a second time dimension.

== See also ==
- Dilaton
- Axion
- M-theory
