= Type I supergravity =

Ten-dimensional supergravity

In supersymmetry, type I supergravity is the theory of supergravity in ten dimensions with a single supercharge. It consists of a single supergravity multiplet and a single Yang–Mills multiplet. The full non-abelian action was first derived in 1983 by George Chapline and Nicholas Manton. Classically the theory can admit any gauge group, but a consistent quantum theory resulting in anomaly cancellation only exists if the gauge group is either $\text{SO}(32)$ or $E_8\times E_8$. Both these supergravities are realised as the low-energy limits of string theories, in particular of type I string theory and of the two heterotic string theories.

== History ==
Supergravity was much studied during the 1980s as a candidate theory of nature. As part of this it was important to understand the various supergravities that can exist in different dimensions, with the possible supergravities being classified in 1978 by Werner Nahm. Type I supergravity was first written down in 1983, with Eric Bergshoeff, Mees de Roo, Bernard de Wit, and Peter van Nieuwenhuizen describing the abelian theory, and then George Chapline and Nicholas Manton extending this to the full non-abelian theory. An important development was made by Michael Green and John Schwarz in 1984 when they showed that only a handful of these theories are anomaly free, with additional work showing that only $\text{SO}(32)$ and $E_8\times E_8$ result in a consistent quantum theory. The first case was known at the time to correspond to the low-energy limit of type I superstrings. Heterotic string theories were discovered the next year, with these having a low-energy limit described by type I supergravity with both gauge groups.

== Theory ==
Type I supergravity is the ten-dimensional supergravity with a single Majorana–Weyl spinor supercharge. (Note: This supergravity is sometimes written as $\mathcal N=(1,0)$ or $\mathcal N=(0,1)$ supergravity to indicate the chirality of the supercharge, with these two theories being equivalent up to a chirality transformation.) Its field content consists of the $\mathcal N=1$ supergravity supermultiplet $(g_{\mu\nu}, \psi_\mu, B, \lambda, \phi)$, together with the $\mathcal N=1$ Yang–Mills supermultiplet $(A_\mu^a, \chi^a)$ with some associated gauge group. Here $g_{\mu\nu}$ is the metric, $B$ is the two-form Kalb–Ramond field, $\phi$ is the dilaton, and $A_\mu^a$ is a Yang–Mills gauge field. Meanwhile, $\psi_\mu$ is the gravitino, $\lambda$ is a dilatino, and $\chi^a$ a gaugino, with all these being Majorana–Weyl spinors. The gravitino and gaugino have the same chirality, while the dilatino has the opposite chirality.

=== Algebra ===
The superalgebra for type I supersymmetry is given by

$$\{Q_\alpha, Q_\beta\} = (P\gamma^\mu C)_{\alpha \beta}P_\mu + (P\gamma^{\mu\nu\rho\sigma\delta}C)_{\alpha \beta}Z_{\mu\nu\rho\sigma \delta}.$$

Here $Q_\alpha$ is the supercharge with a fixed chirality $PQ_\alpha = Q_\alpha$, where $P = \tfrac{1}{2}(1\pm \gamma_*)$ is the relevant projection operator. Meanwhile, $C$ is the charge conjugation operator and $\gamma^{\mu}$ are the gamma matrices. The right-hand side must have the same chirality as the supercharges and must also be symmetric under an exchange of the spinor indices. The second term is the only central charge that is admissible under these constraints up to Poincaré duality. This is because in ten dimensions only $P\gamma^{\mu_1 \cdots \mu_p}C$ with $p=1$ modulo $4$ are symmetric matrices. (Note: There is no central charge for the first case since it is equivalent to a redefinition $P_\mu \sim P_\mu+Z_\mu$.) The central charge corresponds to a 5-brane solution in the supergravity which is dual to the fundamental string in heterotic string theory.

=== Action ===
The action for type I supergravity in the Einstein frame is given up to four-fermion terms by (Note: The fields have been rescaled from Green, Schwartz, Witten, as $\phi^{\text{GSW}} = e^\phi$, $H_{\mu\nu\rho}^{\text{GSW}} = \tfrac{g^2}{\kappa^2}H_{\mu\nu\rho}$, $B_{\mu\nu}^{\text{GSW}} = \tfrac{g^2}{\kappa^2}B_{\mu\nu}$, along with a rescaling of all fermions by a factor of $\kappa^{-1}$.)

$$S = \frac{1}{2\kappa^2}\int d^{10} x \ e \bigg[ R -2\partial_\mu \phi \partial^\mu \phi -\tfrac{3}{4} e^{-2\phi}H_{\mu\nu\rho}H^{\mu\nu\rho} - \tfrac{\kappa^2}{2g^2}e^{-\phi}\text{tr}(F_{\mu\nu}F^{\mu\nu})$$
$$\ \ \ -\bar \psi_\mu \gamma^{\mu\nu\rho}D_\nu \psi_\rho -\bar \lambda \gamma^\mu D_\mu \lambda - \text{tr}(\bar \chi \gamma^\mu D_\mu \chi)$$
$$\ \ \ -\sqrt 2\bar \psi_\mu \gamma^\nu \gamma^\mu \lambda \partial_\nu \phi + \tfrac{1}{8}e^{-\phi}\text{tr}(\bar \chi \gamma^{\mu\nu\rho}\chi)H_{\mu\nu\rho}$$
$$\ \ \ -\tfrac{\kappa}{2g}e^{-\phi/2}\text{tr}[\bar \chi \gamma^\mu \gamma^{\nu\rho}(\psi_\mu + \tfrac{\sqrt 2}{12}\gamma_\mu \lambda)F_{\nu\rho}]$$
$$\ \ \ + \tfrac{1}{8}e^{-\phi}(\bar \psi_\mu \gamma^{\mu\nu\rho\sigma\delta}\psi_\delta + 6 \bar \psi^\nu \gamma^\rho \psi^\sigma - \sqrt 2 \bar \psi_\mu \gamma^{\nu\rho \sigma}\gamma^\mu \lambda)H_{\nu\rho\sigma}\bigg].$$

Here $\kappa^2$ is the gravitational coupling constant, $\phi$ is the dilaton, and

$$H_{\mu\nu\rho} =\partial_{[\mu} B_{\nu\rho]} - \tfrac{\kappa^2}{g^2}\omega_{\text{YM},\mu\nu\rho},$$

where $\omega_{\text{YM}}$ is the trace of the Yang–Mills Chern–Simons form given by

$$\omega_{\text{YM}} = \text{tr}(A \wedge dA +\tfrac{2}{3}A\wedge A \wedge A).$$

The non-abelian field strength tensor corresponding to the gauge field $A_\mu$ is denote by $F_{\mu\nu}$. The spacetime index gamma-matrices are position-dependent fields $\gamma_\mu = e_\mu^a \gamma_a$. Meanwhile, $D_\mu$ is the covariant derivative $D_\mu = \partial_\mu + \tfrac{1}{4}\omega_\mu^{ab}\gamma_{ab}$, while $\gamma_{ab} = \gamma_a\gamma_b$ and $\omega_\mu^{ab}$ is the spin connection.

=== Supersymmetry transformations ===
The supersymmetry transformation rules are given up to three fermion terms by

$$\delta e^a{}_\mu = \tfrac{1}{2}\bar \epsilon \gamma^a\psi_\mu,$$
$$\delta \psi_\mu = D_\mu \epsilon + \tfrac{1}{32}e^{-\phi}(\gamma_\mu{}^{\nu\rho\sigma}-9\delta^\nu_\mu \gamma^{\rho\sigma})\epsilon H_{\nu\rho\sigma},$$
$$\delta B_{\mu\nu} = \tfrac{1}{2}e^\phi \bar \epsilon (\gamma_\mu \psi_\nu - \gamma_\nu \psi_\mu - \tfrac{1}{\sqrt 2}\gamma_{\mu\nu}\lambda)+\tfrac{\kappa}{g}e^{\phi/2}\bar \epsilon \gamma_{[\mu}\text{tr}(\chi A_{\nu]}),$$
$$\delta \phi = -\tfrac{1}{2\sqrt 2}\bar \epsilon \lambda,$$
$$\delta \lambda = -\tfrac{\kappa}{\sqrt 2}{\partial\!\!\!/}\phi + \tfrac{1}{8\sqrt 2}e^{-\phi}\gamma^{\mu\nu\rho}\epsilon H_{\mu\nu\rho},$$
$$\delta A_\mu^a = \tfrac{g}{2\kappa}e^{\phi/2}\bar \epsilon \gamma_\mu \chi^a,$$
$$\delta \chi^a = -\tfrac{\kappa}{4g} e^{-\phi/2}\gamma^{\mu\nu}F^a_{\mu\nu}\epsilon.$$

The supersymmetry parameter is denoted by $\epsilon$. These transformation rules are useful for constructing the Killing spinor equations and finding supersymmetric ground states.

=== Anomaly cancellation ===
At a classical level the supergravity has an arbitrary gauge group, however not all gauge groups are consistent at the quantum level. The Green–Schwartz anomaly cancellation mechanism is used to show when the gauge, mixed, and gravitational anomalies vanish in hexagonal diagrams. In particular, the only anomaly free type I supergravity theories are ones with gauge groups of $\text{SO}(32)$, $E_8\times E_8$, $E_8\times \text{U}(1)^{248}$, and $\text{U}(1)^{496}$. It was later found that the latter two with abelian factors are inconsistent theories of quantum gravity. The remaining two theories both have ultraviolet completions to string theory, where the corresponding string theories can also be shown to be anomaly free at the string level.

== Relation to string theory ==
Type I supergravity is the low-energy effective field theory of type I string theory and both heterotic string theories. In particular, type I string theory and $\text{SO}(32)$ heterotic string theory reduce to type I supergravity with an $\text{SO}(32)$ gauge group, while $E_8\times E_8$ heterotic string theory reduces to type I supergravity with an $E_8\times E_8$ gauge group. There are additional corrections that the supergravity receives in string theory, notably the Chern–Simons term becomes a linear combination of the Yang–Mills Chern–Simons three-form found at tree-level and a Lorentz Chern–Simons three-form $\omega_{\text{YM}}\rightarrow \omega_{\text{YM}}-\omega_{\text{L}}$. This latter three-form is a higher-derivative correction given by

$$\omega_{\text{L}} = \text{tr}(\omega\wedge d\omega + \tfrac{2}{3}\omega \wedge \omega \wedge \omega)$$,

where $\omega$ is the spin connection. To maintain supersymmetry of the action when this term is included, additional higher-derivative corrections must be added to the action up to second order in $\kappa$.

In type I string theory, the gauge coupling constant is related to the ten-dimensional Yang–Mills coupling constant by $g_{YM}^2 = g^2g_s$, while the coupling constant is related to the string length $l_s = \sqrt{\alpha'}$ by $g^2 = 4\pi(2\pi l_s)^6$. Meanwhile, in heterotic string theory the gravitational coupling constant is related to the string length by $2\kappa = l_s g$.

The fields in the Einstein frame are not the same as the fields corresponding to the string states. Instead, one has to transform the action into the various string frames through a Weyl transformation and dilaton redefinition

$$\text{Heterotic}: \ \ \ \ \ \ \ \ g_{\mu\nu}=e^{-\phi_h/2}g_{h,\mu\nu}, \ \ \ \ \ \ \phi = \phi_h/2,$$
$$\text{Type I}: \ \ \ \ \ \ \ \ \ \ \ \ g_{\mu\nu} = e^{-\phi_I/2}g_{I,\mu\nu}, \ \ \ \ \ \ \ \phi = -\phi_I/2.$$

S-duality between type I string theory and $\text{SO}(32)$ heterotic string theory can be seen at the level of the action since the respective string frame actions are equivalent with the correct field redefinitions. Similarly, Hořava–Witten theory, which describes the duality between $E_8\times E_8$ heterotic string theory and M-theory, can also be seen at the level of the supergravity since compactification of eleven-dimensional supergravity on $S^1/\mathbb Z_2$, yields $E_8\times E_8$ supergravity.
