= Augusto Sagnotti =

Italian theoretical physicist

- (2014)
- Born: 1955 (age 70–71); Rome, Italy
- Education: University of Rome "La Sapienza", California Institute of Technology
- Known for: Ultraviolet divergences of Einstein gravity, orientifolds, higher spins
- Scientific career
- Fields: Theoretical physics
- Workplaces: Scuola Normale Superiore
- Doctoral advisor: John H. Schwarz

Augusto Sagnotti (born 1955) is an Italian theoretical physicist at Scuola Normale (since 2005).

== Biography ==
Sagnotti earned a Laurea in Electrical Engineering from the University of Rome "La Sapienza" in 1978 (advisors: Bruno Crosignani and Paolo Di Porto); and a Ph.D. in Theoretical Physics from Caltech in 1983 (advisor: John H. Schwarz). He was Post-Doctoral Fellow at Caltech (1983–84) and Miller Research Fellow at U.C. Berkeley (1984–86).

Sagnotti was Junior Faculty at the University of Rome "Tor Vergata" from 1986 to 1994, then Associate Professor (1994–99) and Professor (2000-2005). His research activity has been devoted to the quantization of the gravitational field, to String Theory, to Conformal Field Theory and to Higher-Spin Gauge Fields.

Sagnotti's main contribution to physics is perhaps the analysis of the 2-loop divergences in Einstein's theory of General Relativity. Moreover, he was the first to propose, in 1987, that the type I string theory can be obtained as an orientifold of type IIB string theory, with 32 half-D9-branes added in the vacuum to cancel various anomalies and offered the elucidation of the key properties of orientifold constructions and of Conformal Field Theory on non-orientable surfaces. He also discovered the 10D "0B' string", including both open and closed strings, non supersymmetric but free of tachyons. He has worked extensively on higher spins, arriving at a geometric formulation of their free field equations in terms of higher-spin curvatures.

More recently, Sagnotti has been working on the proposal of a possible link between "brane supersymmetry breaking", and the onset of the inflationary phase, and on the exploration of some of its possible imprints on the CMB, in particular, the proposal that the low value of the CMB quadrupole and a first peak for l ~5 be a manifestation of the onset of the inflationary phase.

Sagnotti also suggested to his student Kirill Zatrimaylov that elongated mass distributions far away from galactic planes could contribute to explain the flatness of galaxy rotation curves that is normally attributed to dark matter. This proposal was developed in Zatrimaylov's PhD thesis: the rotation curves of several galaxies appear compatible with string-like filaments passing through their centers, as opposed to spherical halos.

== Awards and honors ==
Sagnotti received the Carosio Prize from the University of Rome “La Sapienza” in 1979, a Miller Fellowship from U.C. Berkeley in 1984, shared with Massimo Bianchi the 1994 SIGRAV Prize of the Italian Society for General Relativity and Gravitation, and received the Margherita Hack Prize for Science in 2014 for his work on the quantization of gravity and a Humboldt Research Award in 2018. He was also Andrejewski Lecturer at Humboldt Universitat in Berlin in 1999, and gave the "Roberto Petronzio Lecture" at the University of Rome Tor Vergata in 2024. He received the 2026 Pomeranchuk Prize from the Institute for Theoretical and Experimental Physics (ITEP) in Moscow.

== Books ==
- String Theory, eds. C. Procesi and A. Sagnotti (Academic Press, 1988)
- String Theory, Quantum Gravity and the Unification of the Fundamental Interactions, eds. M. Bianchi, F. Fucito, V. Marinari and A. Sagnotti (World Scientific, 1992)
- Classical and Quantum Statistical Physics, by C. Heissenberg and A. Sagnotti (Cambridge Univ. Press, 2022)
