= Ashoke Sen =

Indian physicist (born 1956)

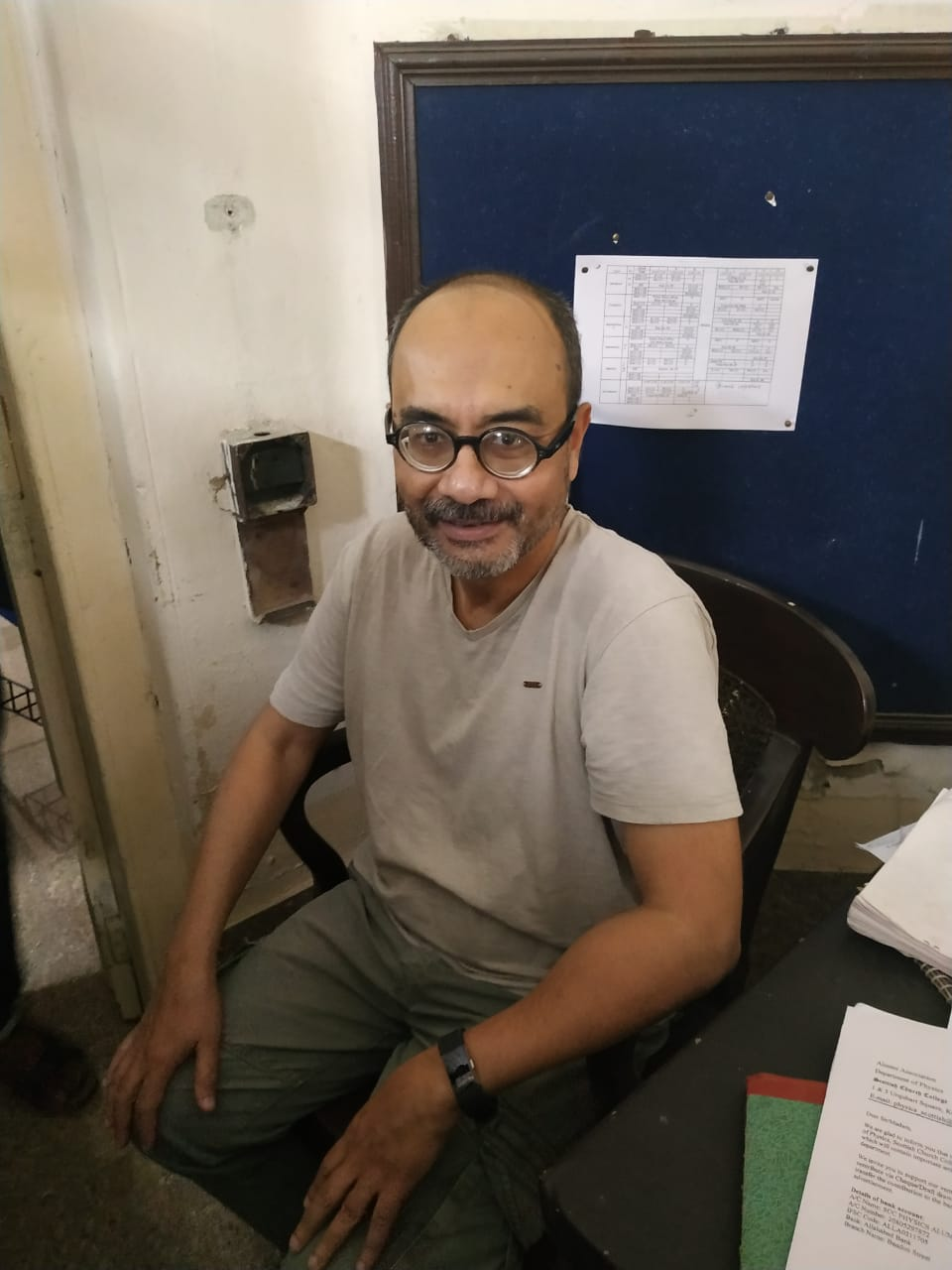
- Sen in the Physics department of Scottish Church College in 2019
- Born: 15 July 1956 (age 70); Calcutta (now Kolkata), West Bengal, India
- Education: Presidency College, Kolkata (BSc); IIT Kanpur (MSc); Stony Brook University (PhD)
- Known for: Contributions to string field theory S-duality; Sen Conjecture
- Spouse: Sumathi Rao
- Awards: G.D. Birla Award for Scientific Research (1996); TWAS Prize (1997); Padma Shri (2001); Infosys Prize - Mathematical Sciences (2009); Breakthrough Prize in Fundamental Physics (2012); Padma Bhushan (2013); Dirac Medal (2014); Oskar Klein Memorial Lecture (2026)
- Scientific career
- Fields: Physics
- Workplaces: Fermilab; Stanford Linear Accelerator Center; Tata Institute of Fundamental Research; Harish-Chandra Research Institute; Indian Institute of Science Education and Research, Bhopal
- Doctoral advisor: George Sterman
- Website: home.icts.res.in/~sen/

Ashoke Sen FRS (/əˈʃoʊk sɛn/; born 1956) is an Indian theoretical physicist and ICTS-Infosys Madhava Chair Professor at the International Centre for Theoretical Sciences (ICTS), Bangalore. A former distinguished professor at the Harish-Chandra Research Institute, Prayagraj, he is also an honorary fellow in National Institute of Science Education and Research (NISER) India. He is also a Morningstar Visiting Professor at the Massachusetts Institute of Technology (MIT) and a distinguished professor at the Korea Institute for Advanced Study. His main area of work is string theory. He was among the first recipients of the Breakthrough Prize in Fundamental Physics "for opening the path to the realization that all string theories are different limits of the same underlying theory".

== Early life ==
He was born on 15 July 1956 in Kolkata, and is the elder son of Anil Kumar Sen, a former professor of physics at the Scottish Church College, Kolkata, and Gouri Sen, a homemaker.

After completing his schooling from Sailendra Sircar Vidyalaya in Kolkata, he earned his Bachelor of Science degree in 1975 from the Presidency College under the University of Calcutta, and his master's a year later from the Indian Institute of Technology Kanpur. During his undergraduate studies at Presidency, he was greatly inspired by the work and teaching of Amal Kumar Raychaudhuri. He did his doctoral work in physics at Stony Brook University.

== Career ==
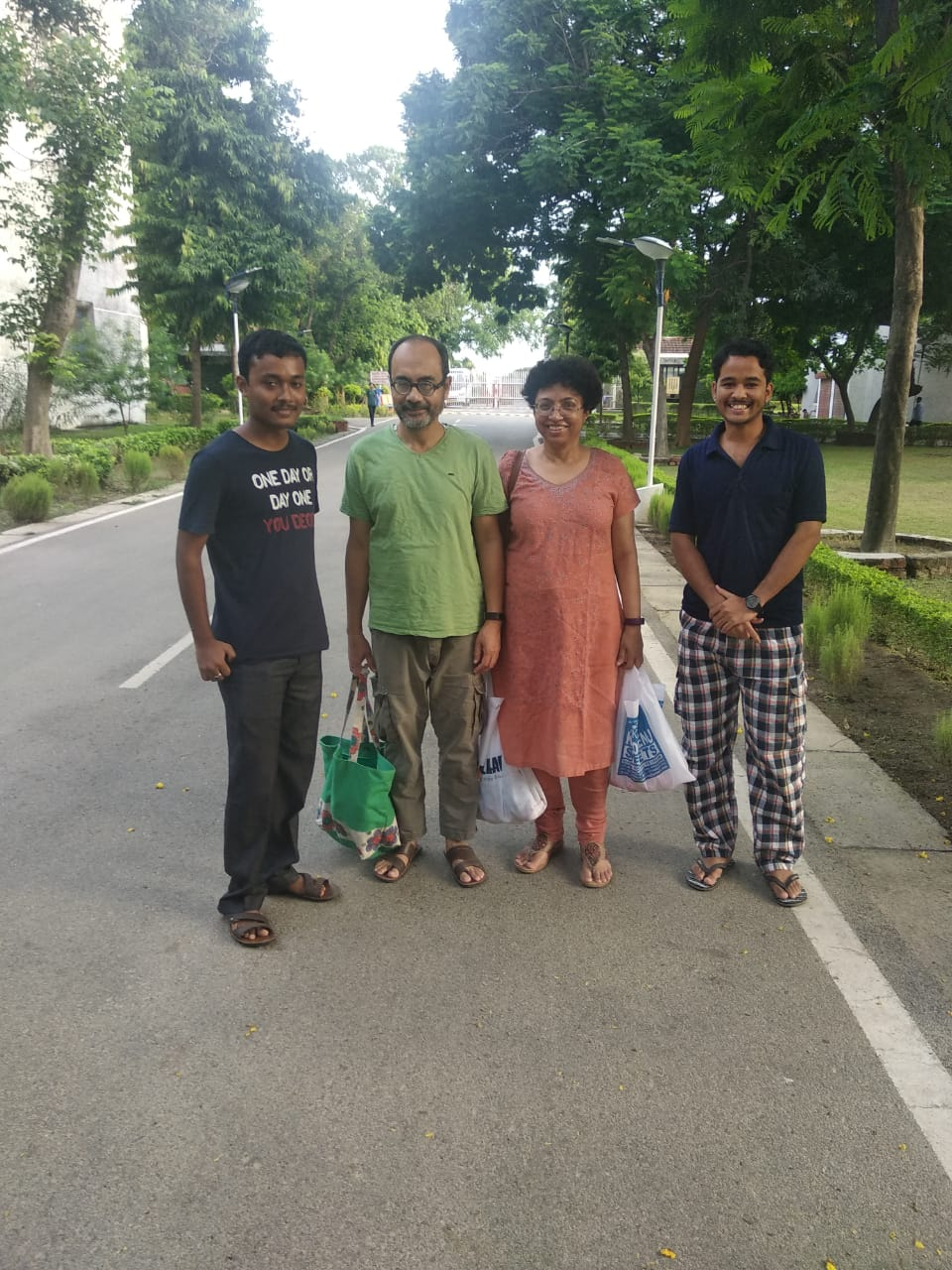
Sen and Sumathi Rao with students at Harish-Chandra Research Institute, 2018

Ashoke Sen made a number of major original contributions to the subject of string theory, including his landmark paper on strong-weak coupling duality or S-duality, which was influential in changing the course of research in the field. He pioneered the study of unstable D-branes and made the famous Sen conjecture about open string tachyon condensation on such branes. His description of rolling tachyons has been influential in string cosmology. He has also co-authored many important papers on string field theory.

In 1998, he won the fellowship of the Royal Society on being nominated by the theoretical physicist Stephen Hawking. His contributions include the entropy function formalism for extremal black holes and its applications to attractors. His important works include the attractor mechanism and the precision counting of microstates of black holes, and new developments in string perturbation theory. He joined the National Institute of Science Education and Research (NISER) India as an honorary professor in the School of Physical Sciences. In the year 2020, he joined Indian Institute of Science Education and Research, Bhopal (IISER Bhopal), Bhopal, Madhya Pradesh, India as a visiting/adjunct professor in the Department of Physics. He is currently serving as a distinguished professor at the International Centre for Theoretical Sciences, Bangalore where he is working on string theory. His specific research interests include S-duality, tachyon condensation, black hole entropy and superstring perturbation theory.

== Honours and awards ==
- ICTP Prize in 1989
- Fellow of the Indian Academy of Sciences in 1991
- S.S. Bhatnagar award in 1994
- TWAS Prize 1997
- Fellow of the Royal Society 1998
- Fellow of the Indian National Science Academy in 1996
- Padma Shri in 2001
- Infosys Prize in the Mathematical Sciences, 2009
- Fundamental Physics Prize, 2012, for his work on string theory
- Padma Bhushan in 2013
- M.P. Birla Memorial Award in 2013
- Dirac Medal in 2014
- Oskar Klein Memorial Lecture Medal in 2026
