= Open string =

Open string may refer to:

- Open string (music), a fundamental note of a stringed instrument
- Open string (physics), a string with endpoints in string theory
