= Robert Leigh (physicist) =

Canadian physicist (born 1964)

Robert G. Leigh
- Born: April 23, 1964; Ontario, Canada
- Died: April 18, 2026 (aged 61)
- Education: University of Guelph; University of Texas at Austin
- Known for: D-brane
- Scientific career
- Fields: particle physics
- Workplaces: University of Illinois at Urbana-Champaign
- Doctoral advisor: Joseph Polchinski

Robert Graham Leigh (b. April 23, 1964, d. April 18, 2026) was a Canadian physicist working on string theory.

== Biography ==
Robert G. Leigh graduated Valedictorian from John McGregor Secondary School in Chatham, Ontario, Canada in 1982. He received his Bachelor of Science degree in Theoretical Physics from the University of Guelph in 1986; his advisor was Professor George Leibbrandt. In 1986, Leigh was awarded a four-year Natural Sciences and Engineering Research Council of Canada (NSERC) Postgraduate Scholarship, when he went on to earn his Ph.D. in theoretical particle physics from the University of Texas at Austin in 1991, working with Joe Polchinski. His doctoral dissertation was titled “Topics in String Duality, CP Violation, and Baryogenesis.”

After postdoctoral research positions at Santa Cruz Institute for Particle Physics at the University of California, Santa Cruz and Rutgers in New Jersey, Leigh was a professor in the Department of Physics at the University of Illinois at Urbana-Champaign from 1996 until his death in 2026.

From 2002-2003, Leigh took a sabbatical as a scientific associate at the European Organization for Nuclear Research (CERN—Conseil Européen pour la Recherche Nucléaire), in Geneva, Switzerland. From 2011-2012, 2018-2019, and 2023-2025, Leigh was a Visiting Researcher at the Perimeter Institute for Theoretical Physics in Waterloo, Ontario, Canada, where he contributed to building the Physics Master's Program - Perimeter Scholars International (PSI) and served as an evaluator.

From 1997-2000, Leigh was named Outstanding Junior Investigator by the US Department of Energy (DOE). Since 2007, Leigh has been a Fellow of the American Physical Society. In 2010, he became an associate of the Center for Advanced Study at the University of Illinois; he was also a member of the Illinois Quantum Information Science and Technology Center (IQUIST) in the Grainger College of Engineering at the University of Illinois.

Leigh's work centered on string theory, supersymmetric field theories, gauge theories, and other topics in particle physics, early-universe cosmology, and condensed matter.

Leigh discovered, in association with Jin Dai and Joseph Polchinski, an important class of extended objects in string theory, the D-branes (Dirichlet membranes).

In his first papers, Leigh wrote about his discovery of D-branes and orientifolds in string theory, providing the first example of superstring duality. In this work, he derived the Dirac-Born-Infeld action describing the dynamics of D-branes. D-branes correspond to non-perturbative states unique to string theory and are analogous to magnetic monopoles in field theory.

Leigh also did work on the existence of conformal field theories and the use of intersecting branes and branes at singularities in particle physics model building. His research interests in his final years included applications of the holographic duality to study particle physics, gravity and condensed matter physics. His final paper, an essay written for the Gravity Research Foundation 2025 Awards for Essays on Gravitation outlined a new approach to quantum gravity that combined many of his recent efforts - including the study of edge modes in local gauge theories and operators algebra methods.

Outside of Physics, Leigh was a hockey fan and an avid collector of historical postcards, postmarks, stamps, and hockey cards. He also contributed significantly to Canadian philately, particularly to postal history, for over 20 years. He was very involved in the Postal History Society of Canada (PHSC) and was its Webmaster from 2006 until shortly before he died. He developed and maintained PHSC's website, as well as built and maintained several postmark databases and other postal history research tools. Leigh was Vice-President of PHSC from 2010 to 2025 and Director for several years before that. Leigh was elected Fellow of the Postal History Society of Canada on July 21, 2018.

Leigh was the Webmaster of the ORAPEX (Ottawa Regional Association of Philatelic Exhibitions) National level show from 2006 to 2025. Leigh exhibited postal history at the National level and won awards, including several Grand Awards. One of his highest accomplishments was for his exhibit "The Western District of Upper Canada: The Development of Postal Communications and Postal Markings" which won the APS (American Philatelic Society) World Series of Philately (WSP) Prix d’Honneur in 2018 (Columbus) and 2019 (Omaha).

Leigh's major philately exhibitions included:

- "The Western District of Upper Canada: The Development of Postal Communications and Postal Markings, 1800-1850"

- "The Bickerdike Postmarking Machines of Hamilton, 1897-1902"

- "The Early Machine Cancels of Canada 1896-1902"

- "The 1935 Special Delivery Issue of Canada"

Leigh wrote over a dozen postal history articles in British North America Philatelic Society's BNA Topics, the PHSC Journal, Maple Leaves journal and The American Philatelist, as well as two BNAPS (British North America Philatelic Society Ltd.) Exhibit Series publications.

One of Leigh's articles, "Canada’s Stampless Era: a Glimpse into Canada’s Early Postal History" published in The American Philatelist, received the 2023 PHSC Frank W. Campbell Award for most outstanding Canadian/BNA postal history publication the most outstanding Canadian or BNA postal history publication appearing outside the PHSC Journal. In September 2025, Leigh was awarded a Lifetime Achievement Award by the British North America Philatelic Society. Leigh was honored in Canadian Stamp News.

Robert G. Leigh died on April 18, 2026 at his home in Champaign, Illinois, USA, at the age of 61, from a glioblastoma (malignant brain tumor).
