= Vorton =

A vorton is a hypothetical circular cosmic string loop stabilized by the angular momentum of the charge and current trapped on the string. Vortons were coined by R. L. Davis and E. Paul Shellard in 1989.
