= U-duality =

Conjectured duality combining S-duality and T-duality

In physics, U-duality (short for unified duality) is a symmetry of string theory or M-theory combining S-duality and T-duality transformations. The term is most often met in the context of the "U-duality (symmetry) group" of M-theory as defined on a particular background space (topological manifold). This is the union of all the S-duality and T-duality available in that topology. The narrow meaning of the word "U-duality" is one of those dualities that can be classified neither as an S-duality, nor as a T-duality - a transformation that exchanges a large geometry of one theory with the strong coupling of another theory, for example.

The idea was introduced by Hull and Townsend.
