= Orientifold =

Concept in theoretical physics

In theoretical physics orientifold is a generalization of the notion of orbifold, proposed by Augusto Sagnotti in 1987. The novelty is that in the case of string theory the non-trivial element(s) of the orbifold group includes the reversal of the orientation of the string. Orientifolding therefore produces unoriented strings—strings that carry no "arrow" and whose two opposite orientations are equivalent. Type I string theory is the simplest example of such a theory and can be obtained by orientifolding type IIB string theory.

In mathematical terms, given a smooth manifold $\mathcal{M}$, two discrete, freely acting, groups $G_{1}$ and $G_{2}$ and the worldsheet parity operator $\Omega_{p}$ (such that $\Omega_{p} : \sigma \to 2\pi - \sigma$) an orientifold is expressed as the quotient space $\mathcal{M}/(G_{1} \cup \Omega G_{2})$. If $G_{2}$ is empty, then the quotient space is an orbifold. If $G_{2}$ is not empty, then it is an orientifold.

== Application to string theory ==
In string theory $\mathcal{M}$ is the compact space formed by rolling up the theory's extra dimensions, specifically a six-dimensional Calabi–Yau space. The simplest viable compact spaces are those formed by modifying a torus.

=== Supersymmetry breaking ===
The six dimensions take the form of a Calabi–Yau for reasons of partially breaking the supersymmetry of the string theory to make it more phenomenologically viable. The Type II string theories have 32 real supercharges, and compactifying on a six-dimensional torus leaves them all unbroken. Compactifying on a more general Calabi–Yau sixfold, 3/4 of the supersymmetry is removed to yield a four-dimensional theory with 8 real supercharges (N=2). To break this further to the only non-trivial phenomenologically viable supersymmetry, N=1, half of the supersymmetry generators must be projected out and this is achieved by applying the orientifold projection.

=== Effect on field content ===
A simpler alternative to using Calabi–Yaus to break to N=2 is to use an orbifold originally formed from a torus. In such cases it is simpler to examine the symmetry group associated to the space as the group is given in the definition of the space.

The orbifold group $G_{1}$ is restricted to those groups which work crystallographically on the torus lattice, i.e. lattice preserving. $G_{2}$ is generated by an involution $\sigma$, not to be confused with the parameter signifying position along the length of a string. The involution acts on the holomorphic 3-form $\Omega$ (again, not to be confused with the parity operator above) in different ways depending on the particular string formulation being used.

- Type IIB : $\sigma (\Omega) = \Omega$ or $\sigma (\Omega) = -\Omega$
- Type IIA : $\sigma (\Omega) = \bar{\Omega}$

The locus where the orientifold action reduces to the change of the string orientation is called the orientifold plane. The involution leaves the large dimensions of space-time unaffected and so orientifolds can have O-planes of at least dimension 3. In the case of $\sigma (\Omega) = \Omega$ it is possible that all spatial dimensions are left unchanged and O9 planes can exist. The orientifold plane in type I string theory is the spacetime-filling O9-plane.

More generally, one can consider orientifold Op-planes where the dimension p is counted in analogy with Dp-branes. O-planes and D-branes can be used within the same construction and generally carry opposite tension to one another.

However, unlike D-branes, O-planes are not dynamical. They are defined entirely by the action of the involution, not by string boundary conditions as D-branes are. Both O-planes and D-branes must be taken into account when computing tadpole constraints.

The involution also acts on the complex structure (1,1)-form J

- Type IIB : $\sigma (J) = J$
- Type IIA : $\sigma (J) = -J$

This has the result that the number of moduli parameterising the space is reduced. Since $\sigma$ is an involution, it has eigenvalues $\pm 1$. The (1,1)-form basis $\omega_{i}$, with dimension $h^{1,1}$ (as defined by the Hodge diamond of the orientifold's cohomology) is written in such a way that each basis form has definite sign under $\sigma$. Since moduli $A_{i}$ are defined by $J = A_{i}\omega_{i}$ and J must transform as listed above under $\sigma$, only those moduli paired with 2-form basis elements of the correct parity under $\sigma$ survive. Therefore, $\sigma$ creates a splitting of the cohomology as $h^{1,1} = h^{1,1}_{+} + h^{1,1}_{-}$ and the number of moduli used to describe the orientifold is, in general, less than the number of moduli used to describe the orbifold used to construct the orientifold. Although the orientifold projects out half of the supersymmetry generators the number of moduli it projects out can vary from space to space. In some cases $h^{1,1} = h^{1,1}_{\pm}$, in that all of the (1-1)-forms have the same parity under the orientifold projection. In such cases the way in which the different supersymmetry content enters into the moduli behaviour is through the flux dependent scalar potential the moduli experience, the N=1 case is different from the N=2 case.
