= T-duality =

Equivalence of two physical theories

In theoretical physics, T-duality (short for target-space duality) is an equivalence of two physical theories, which may be either quantum field theories or string theories. In the simplest example of this relationship, one of the theories describes strings propagating in spacetime shaped like a circle of some radius $R$, while the other theory describes strings propagating on a spacetime shaped like a circle of radius proportional to $1/R$. The idea of T-duality was first noted by Bala Sathiapalan in an obscure paper in 1987. The two T-dual theories are equivalent in the sense that all observable quantities in one description are identified with quantities in the dual description. For example, momentum in one description takes discrete values and is equal to the number of times the string winds around the circle in the dual description.

The idea of T-duality can be extended to more complicated theories, including superstring theories. The existence of these dualities implies that seemingly different superstring theories are actually physically equivalent. This led to the realization, in the mid-1990s, that all of the five consistent superstring theories are just different limiting cases of a single eleven-dimensional theory called M-theory.

In general, T-duality relates two theories with different spacetime geometries. In this way, T-duality suggests a possible scenario in which the classical notions of geometry break down in a theory of Planck scale physics. The geometric relationships suggested by T-duality are also important in pure mathematics. Indeed, according to the SYZ conjecture of Andrew Strominger, Shing-Tung Yau, and Eric Zaslow, T-duality is closely related to another duality called mirror symmetry, which has important applications in a branch of mathematics called enumerative algebraic geometry.

== Overview ==
=== Strings and duality ===
T-duality is a particular example of a general notion of duality in physics. The term duality refers to a situation where two seemingly different physical systems turn out to be equivalent in a nontrivial way. If two theories are related by a duality, it means that one theory can be transformed in some way so that it ends up looking just like the other theory. The two theories are then said to be dual to one another under the transformation. Put differently, the two theories are mathematically different descriptions of the same phenomena.

Like many of the dualities studied in theoretical physics, T-duality was discovered in the context of string theory. In string theory, particles are modeled not as zero-dimensional points but as one-dimensional extended objects called strings. The physics of strings can be studied in various numbers of dimensions. In addition to three familiar dimensions from everyday experience (up/down, left/right, forward/backward), string theories may include one or more compact dimensions which are curled up into circles.

A standard analogy for this is to consider multidimensional object such as a garden hose. If the hose is viewed from a sufficient distance, it appears to have only one dimension, its length. However, as one approaches the hose, one discovers that it contains a second dimension, its circumference. Thus, an ant crawling inside it would move in two dimensions. Such extra dimensions are important in T-duality, which relates a theory in which strings propagate on a circle of some radius $R$ to a theory in which strings propagate on a circle of radius $1/R$.

=== Winding numbers ===
In mathematics, the winding number of a curve in the plane around a given point is an integer representing the total number of times that curve travels counterclockwise around the point. The notion of winding number is important in the mathematical description of T-duality where it is used to measure the winding of strings around compact extra dimensions.

For example, the image below shows several examples of curves in the plane, illustrated in red. Each curve is assumed to be closed, meaning it has no endpoints, and is allowed to intersect itself. Each curve has an orientation given by the arrows in the picture. In each situation, there is a distinguished point in the plane, illustrated in black. The winding number of the curve around this distinguished point is equal to the total number of counterclockwise turns that the curve makes around this point.

$\cdots$
	−2	−1	0
				$\cdots$
	1	2	3

When counting the total number of turns, counterclockwise turns count as positive, while clockwise turns counts as negative. For example, if the curve first circles the origin four times counterclockwise, and then circles the origin once clockwise, then the total winding number of the curve is three. According to this scheme, a curve that does not travel around the distinguished point at all has winding number zero, while a curve that travels clockwise around the point has negative winding number. Therefore, the winding number of a curve may be any integer. The pictures above show curves with winding numbers between −2 and 3:

=== Quantized momenta ===
The simplest theories in which T-duality arises are two-dimensional sigma models with circular target spaces, i.e. compactified free bosons. These are simple quantum field theories that describe propagation of strings in an imaginary spacetime shaped like a circle. The strings can thus be modeled as curves in the plane that are confined to lie in a circle, say of radius $R$, about the origin. In what follows, the strings are assumed to be closed (that is, without endpoints).

Denote this circle by $S_R^1$. One can think of this circle as a copy of the real line with two points identified if they differ by a multiple of the circle's circumference $2\pi R$. It follows that the state of a string at any given time can be represented as a function $\varphi(\theta)$ of a single real parameter $\theta$. Such a function can be expanded in a Fourier series as

$$\varphi(\theta)=mR\theta+x+\sum_{n\neq0}c_ne^{in\theta}$$.

Here $m$ denotes the winding number of the string around the circle, and the constant mode $x=c_0$ of the Fourier series has been singled out. Since this expression represents the configuration of a string at a fixed time, all coefficients ($x$ and the $c_n$) are also functions of time.

Let $\dot{x}$ denote the time derivative of the constant mode $x$. This represents a type of momentum in the theory. One can show, using the fact that the strings considered here are closed, that this momentum can only take on discrete values of the form $\dot{x}=n/R$ for some integer $n$. In more physical language, one says that the momentum spectrum is quantized.

=== An equivalence of theories ===
In the situation described above, the total energy, or Hamiltonian, of the string is given by the expression

$$H=(mR)^2+\dot{x}^2+\sum_n|\dot{c}_n|^2+n^2|c_n|^2$$.

Since the momenta of the theory are quantized, the first two terms in this formula are $(mR)^2+(n/R)^2$, and this expression is unchanged when one simultaneously replaces the radius $R$ by $1/R$ and exchanges the winding number $m$ and the integer $n$. The summation in the expression for $H$ is similarly unaffected by these changes, so the total energy is unchanged. In fact, this equivalence of Hamiltonians descends to an equivalence of two quantum mechanical theories: One of these theories describes strings propagating on a circle of radius $R$, while the other describes string propagating in a circle of radius $1/R$ with momentum and winding numbers interchanged. This equivalence of theories is the simplest manifestation of T-duality.

== Superstrings ==
A diagram of string theory dualities. Blue edges indicate S-duality. Red edges indicate T-duality.

Up until the mid 1990s, physicists working on string theory believed there were five distinct versions of the theory: type I, type IIA, type IIB, and the two flavors of heterotic string theory (SO(32) and E_{8}×E_{8}). The different theories allow different types of strings, and the particles that arise at low energies exhibit different symmetries.

In the mid 1990s, physicists noticed that these five string theories are actually related by highly nontrivial dualities. One of these dualities is T-duality. For example, it was shown that type IIA string theory is equivalent to type IIB string theory via T-duality and also that the two versions of heterotic string theory are related by T-duality.

The existence of these dualities showed that the five string theories were in fact not all distinct theories. In 1995, at the string theory conference at University of Southern California, Edward Witten made the surprising suggestion that all five of these theories were just different limits of a single theory now known as M-theory. Witten's proposal was based on the observation that different superstring theories are linked by dualities and the fact that type IIA and E_{8}×E_{8} heterotic string theories are closely related to a gravitational theory called eleven-dimensional supergravity. His announcement led to a flurry of work now known as the second superstring revolution.

== Mirror symmetry ==
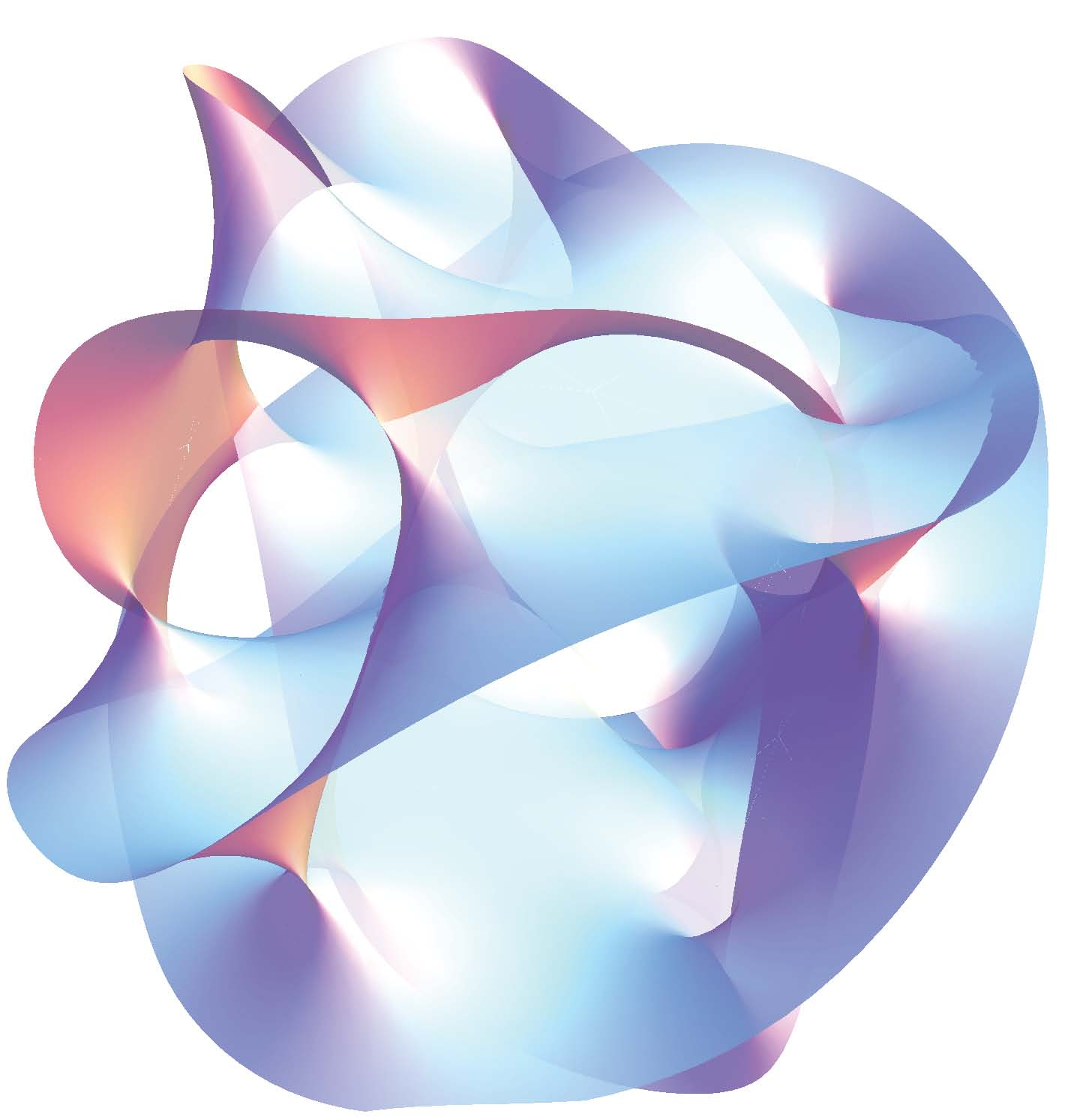
A hypersurface of a six-dimensional Calabi–Yau manifold

In string theory and algebraic geometry, the term "mirror symmetry" refers to a phenomenon involving complicated shapes called Calabi–Yau manifolds. These manifolds provide an interesting geometry on which strings can propagate, and the resulting theories may have applications in particle physics. In the late 1980s, it was noticed that such a Calabi–Yau manifold does not uniquely determine the physics of the theory. Instead, one finds that there are two Calabi–Yau manifolds that give rise to the same physics. These manifolds are said to be "mirror" to one another. This mirror duality is an important computational tool in string theory, and it has allowed mathematicians to solve difficult problems in enumerative geometry.

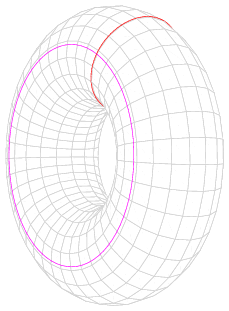
A torus is the cartesian product of two circles.

One approach to understanding mirror symmetry is the SYZ conjecture, which was suggested by Andrew Strominger, Shing-Tung Yau, and Eric Zaslow in 1996. According to the SYZ conjecture, mirror symmetry can be understood by dividing a complicated Calabi–Yau manifold into simpler pieces and considering the effects of T-duality on these pieces.

The simplest example of a Calabi–Yau manifold is a torus (a surface shaped like a donut). Such a surface can be viewed as the product of two circles. This means that the torus can be viewed as the union of a collection of longitudinal circles (such as the red circle in the image). There is an auxiliary space which says how these circles are organized, and this space is itself a circle (the pink circle). This space is said to parametrize the longitudinal circles on the torus. In this case, mirror symmetry is equivalent to T-duality acting on the longitudinal circles, changing their radii from $R$ to $\alpha'/R$, with $\alpha '$ the inverse of the string tension.

The SYZ conjecture generalizes this idea to the more complicated case of six-dimensional Calabi–Yau manifolds like the one illustrated above. As in the case of a torus, one can divide a six-dimensional Calabi–Yau manifold into simpler pieces, which in this case are 3-tori (three-dimensional objects which generalize the notion of a torus) parametrized by a 3-sphere (a three-dimensional generalization of a sphere). T-duality can be extended from circles to the three-dimensional tori appearing in this decomposition, and the SYZ conjecture states that mirror symmetry is equivalent to the simultaneous application of T-duality to these three-dimensional tori. In this way, the SYZ conjecture provides a geometric picture of how mirror symmetry acts on a Calabi–Yau manifold.

== See also ==
- S-duality
- Mirror symmetry
- AdS/CFT correspondence
- Massless free scalar bosons in two dimensions
- Double field theory
