= Superstring theory =

Theory of strings with supersymmetry

Superstring theory is an attempt to explain all of the particles and fundamental forces of nature in one theory by modeling them as vibrations of tiny supersymmetric strings.

'Superstring theory' is a shorthand for supersymmetric string theory because unlike bosonic string theory, it is the version of string theory that accounts for both fermions and bosons and incorporates supersymmetry to model gravity.

Since the second superstring revolution, the five superstring theories (Type I, Type IIA, Type IIB, HO and HE) are regarded as different limits of a single theory tentatively called M-theory.

== Background ==
One of the deepest open problems in theoretical physics is formulating a theory of quantum gravity. Such a theory incorporates both the theory of general relativity, which describes gravitation and applies to large-scale structures, and quantum mechanics or more specifically quantum field theory, which describes the other three fundamental forces that act on the atomic scale.

Quantum field theory, in particular the Standard Model, is currently the most successful theory to describe fundamental forces, but while computing physical quantities of interest, naïvely one obtains infinite values. Physicists developed the technique of renormalization to 'eliminate these infinities' to obtain finite values which can be experimentally tested. This technique works for three of the four fundamental forces: Electromagnetism, the strong force and the weak force, but does not work for gravity, which is non-renormalizable. Development of a quantum theory of gravity therefore requires different means than those used for the other forces.

According to superstring theory, or more generally string theory, the fundamental constituents of reality are strings with radius on the order of the Planck length (about 10^{−33} cm). An appealing feature of string theory is that fundamental particles can be viewed as excitations of the string. The tension in a string is on the order of the Planck force (10^{44} N). The graviton (the proposed messenger particle of the gravitational force) is predicted by the theory to be a string with wave amplitude zero.

== History ==
Investigating how a string theory may include fermions in its spectrum led to the invention of supersymmetry. In 1971, J. L. Gervais and B. Sakita worked on the two-dimensional case in which they use the concept of "supergauge," a mathematical transformation between bosons and fermions. String theories that include fermionic vibrations are now known as "superstring theories".

Since its beginnings in the seventies and through the combined efforts of many different researchers, superstring theory has developed into a broad and varied subject with connections to quantum gravity, particle and condensed matter physics, cosmology, and pure mathematics.

== Absence of physical evidence ==
Superstring theory is based on supersymmetry. No supersymmetric particles have been discovered and initial investigations, carried out in 2011 at the Large Hadron Collider (LHC) and in 2006 at the Tevatron have excluded some of the ranges. For instance, the mass constraint of the Minimal Supersymmetric Standard Model squarks has been up to 1.1 TeV, and gluinos up to 500 GeV. No report on suggesting large extra dimensions has been delivered from the LHC. There have been no principles so far to limit the number of vacua in the concept of a landscape of vacua.

Some particle physicists became disappointed by the lack of experimental verification of supersymmetry, and some have already discarded it. Jon Butterworth at University College London said that we had no sign of supersymmetry, even in higher energy regions, excluding the superpartners of the top quark up to a few TeV. Ben Allanach at the University of Cambridge states that if we do not discover any new particles in the next trial at the LHC, then we can say it is unlikely to discover supersymmetry at CERN in the foreseeable future.

== Extra dimensions ==
Our physical space is observed to have three large spatial dimensions and, along with time, is a boundless 4-dimensional continuum known as spacetime. However, nothing prevents a theory from including more than 4 dimensions. In the case of string theory, consistency requires spacetime to have 10 dimensions (3D regular space + 1 time(1 time dimension is not necessary, it may be multi-dimensional, according to F-theory) + 6D hyperspace). The D = 10 critical dimension was originally discovered by John H. Schwarz. The fact that we see only 3 dimensions of space can be explained by one of two mechanisms: either the extra dimensions are compactified on a very small scale, or else our world may live on a 3-dimensional submanifold corresponding to a brane, on which all known particles besides gravity would be restricted.

If the extra dimensions are compactified, then the extra six dimensions must be in the form of a Calabi–Yau manifold. Within the more complete framework of M-theory, they would have to take form of a G2 manifold. A particular exact symmetry of string/M-theory called T-duality (which exchanges momentum modes for winding number and sends compact dimensions of radius R to radius 1/R), has led to the discovery of equivalences between different Calabi–Yau manifolds called mirror symmetry.

Superstring theory is not the first theory to propose extra spatial dimensions. It can be seen as building upon the Kaluza–Klein theory, which proposed a 4+1 dimensional (5D) theory of gravity. When compactified on a circle, the gravity in the extra dimension precisely describes electromagnetism from the perspective of the 3 remaining large space dimensions. Thus the original Kaluza–Klein theory is a prototype for the unification of gauge and gravity interactions, at least at the classical level, however it is known to be insufficient to describe nature for a variety of reasons (missing weak and strong forces, lack of parity violation, etc.) A more complex compact geometry is needed to reproduce the known gauge forces. Also, to obtain a consistent, fundamental, quantum theory requires the upgrade to string theory, not just the extra dimensions.

== Number of superstring theories ==
Theoretical physicists were troubled by the existence of five separate superstring theories. A possible solution for this dilemma was suggested at the beginning of what is called the second superstring revolution in the 1990s, which suggests that the five string theories might be different limits of a single underlying theory, called M-theory. This remains a conjecture.

String theories
Type	Spacetime dimensions	SUSY generators	chiral	open strings	heterotic compactification	gauge group	tachyon
Bosonic (closed)	26	N = 0	no	no	no	none	yes
Bosonic (open)	26	N = 0	no	yes	no	U(1)	yes
I	10	N = (1,0)	yes	yes	no	SO(32)	no
IIA	10	N = (1,1)	no	no	no	U(1)	no
IIB	10	N = (2,0)	yes	no	no	none	no
HO	10	N = (1,0)	yes	no	yes	SO(32)	no
HE	10	N = (1,0)	yes	no	yes	E_{8} × E_{8}	no
M-theory	11	N = 1	no	no	no	none	no

The five consistent superstring theories are:

- The type I string has one supersymmetry in the ten-dimensional sense (16 supercharges). This theory is special in the sense that it is based on unoriented open and closed strings, while the rest are based on oriented closed strings.
- The type II string theories have two supersymmetries in the ten-dimensional sense (32 supercharges).
  - Type IIA, non-chiral (parity conserving).
  - Type IIB, chiral (parity violating).
- The two heterotic string theories are based on a peculiar hybrid of a type I superstring and a bosonic string; they differ by gauge group.
  - HE (Heterotic E_{8}×E_{8} strings).
  - HO (Heterotic SO(32) (HO) strings). The name heterotic SO(32) is slightly inaccurate since among the SO(32) Lie groups, string theory singles out a quotient Spin(32)/Z_{2} that is not equivalent to SO(32).

Chiral gauge theories can be inconsistent due to anomalies. This happens when certain one-loop Feynman diagrams cause a quantum mechanical breakdown of the gauge symmetry. The anomalies were canceled out via the Green–Schwarz mechanism.

Even though there are only five superstring theories, making detailed predictions for real experiments requires information about exactly what physical configuration the theory is in. This considerably complicates efforts to test string theory because there are an astronomically high number—10^{500} or more—of configurations that meet some of the basic requirements to be consistent with our world. Along with the extreme remoteness of the Planck scale, this is the other major reason it is hard to test superstring theory.

Another approach to the number of superstring theories refers to the mathematical structure called composition algebra. In the findings of abstract algebra there are just seven composition algebras over the field of real numbers. In 1990 physicists R. Foot and G.C. Joshi in Australia stated that "the seven classical superstring theories are in one-to-one correspondence to the seven composition algebras".

== Integrating general relativity and quantum mechanics ==
General relativity typically deals with situations involving large mass objects in fairly large regions of spacetime (when it is applied to small distances it often conflicts with quantum mechanics) whereas quantum mechanics is generally reserved for scenarios at the atomic scale (small spacetime regions). The two are very rarely used together, and the most common case that combines them is in the study of black holes. Having peak density, or the maximum amount of matter possible in a space, and very small area, the two must be used in synchrony to predict conditions in such places. Yet, when used together, the equations fall apart, spitting out impossible answers, such as imaginary distances and less than one dimension.

The major problem with their incongruence is that, at Planck scale (a fundamental small unit of length) lengths, general relativity predicts a smooth, flowing surface, while quantum mechanics predicts a random, warped surface, which are nowhere near compatible. Superstring theory resolves this issue, replacing the classical idea of point particles with strings. These strings have an average diameter of the Planck length, with extremely small variances, which completely ignores the quantum mechanical predictions of Planck-scale length dimensional warping. Also, these surfaces can be mapped as branes. These branes can be viewed as objects with a morphism between them. In this case, the morphism will be the state of a string that stretches between brane A and brane B.

Singularities are avoided because the observed consequences of "Big Crunches" never reach zero size. In fact, should the universe begin a "big crunch" sort of process, string theory dictates that the universe could never be smaller than the size of one string, at which point it would actually begin expanding.

== Mathematics ==
=== D-branes ===
D-branes are membrane-like objects in 10D string theory. They can be thought of as occurring as a result of a Kaluza–Klein compactification of 11D M-theory that contains membranes. Because compactification of a geometric theory produces extra vector fields the D-branes can be included in the action by adding an extra U(1) vector field to the string action.

$$\partial_z \rightarrow \partial_z +iA_z(z,\overline{z})$$

In type I open string theory, the ends of open strings are always attached to D-brane surfaces. A string theory with more gauge fields such as SU(2) gauge fields would then correspond to the compactification of some higher-dimensional theory above 11 dimensions, which is not thought to be possible to date. Furthermore, the tachyons attached to the D-branes show the instability of those D-branes with respect to the annihilation. The tachyon total energy is (or reflects) the total energy of the D-branes.

=== Why five superstring theories? ===
For a 10 dimensional supersymmetric theory we are allowed a 32-component Majorana spinor. This can be decomposed into a pair of 16-component Majorana-Weyl (chiral) spinors. There are then various ways to construct an invariant depending on whether these two spinors have the same or opposite chiralities:

Superstring model	Invariant
Heterotic	$\partial_zX^\mu-i\overline{\theta_L}\Gamma^\mu\partial_z\theta_L$
IIA	$\partial_zX^\mu-i\overline{\theta_L}\Gamma^\mu\partial_z\theta_L - i \overline{\theta_R} \Gamma^\mu\partial_z\theta_R$
IIB	$\partial_z X^\mu-i\overline{\theta^1_L}\Gamma^\mu\partial_z\theta^1_L - i \overline{\theta^2_L}\Gamma^\mu\partial_z\theta^2_L$

The heterotic superstrings come in two types SO(32) and E_{8}×E_{8} as indicated above and the type I superstrings include open strings.

== Beyond superstring theory ==
It is conceivable that the five superstring theories are approximated to a theory in higher dimensions possibly involving membranes. Because the action for this involves quartic terms and higher so is not Gaussian, the functional integrals are very difficult to solve and so this has confounded the top theoretical physicists. Edward Witten has popularised the concept of a theory in 11 dimensions, called M-theory, involving membranes interpolating from the known symmetries of superstring theory. It may turn out that there exist membrane models or other non-membrane models in higher dimensions—which may become acceptable when we find new unknown symmetries of nature, such as noncommutative geometry. It is thought, however, that 16 is probably the maximum since SO(16) is a maximal subgroup of E8, the largest exceptional Lie group, and also is more than large enough to contain the Standard Model. Quartic integrals of the non-functional kind are easier to solve so there is hope for the future. This is the series solution, which is always convergent when a is non-zero and negative:

$$\int_{-\infty}^\infty \exp({a x^4+b x^3+c x^2+d x+f}) \, dx
= e^f \sum_{n,m,p=0}^\infty \frac{ b^{4n}}{(4n)!} \frac{c^{2m}}{(2m)!} \frac{d^{4p}}{(4p)!} \frac{ \Gamma(3n+m+p+\frac14) }{a^{3n+m+p+\frac14} }$$

In the case of membranes the series would correspond to sums of various membrane interactions that are not seen in string theory.

=== Compactification ===
Investigating theories of higher dimensions often involves looking at the 10 dimensional superstring theory and interpreting some of the more obscure results in terms of compactified dimensions. For example, D-branes are seen as compactified membranes from 11D M-theory. Theories of higher dimensions such as 12D F-theory and beyond produce other effects, such as gauge terms higher than U(1). The components of the extra vector fields (A) in the D-brane actions can be thought of as extra coordinates (X) in disguise. However, the known symmetries including supersymmetry currently restrict the spinors to 32-components—which limits the number of dimensions to 11 (or 12 if you include two time dimensions.) Some physicists (e.g., John Baez et al.) have speculated that the exceptional Lie groups E_{6}, E_{7} and E_{8} having maximum orthogonal subgroups SO(10), SO(12) and SO(16) may be related to theories in 10, 12 and 16 dimensions; 10 dimensions corresponding to string theory and the 12 and 16 dimensional theories being yet undiscovered but would be theories based on 3-branes and 7-branes, respectively. However, this is a minority view within the string community. Since E_{7} is in some sense F_{4} quaternified and E_{8} is F_{4} octonified, the 12 and 16 dimensional theories, if they did exist, may involve the noncommutative geometry based on the quaternions and octonions, respectively. From the above discussion, it can be seen that physicists have many ideas for extending superstring theory beyond the current 10 dimensional theory, but so far all have been unsuccessful.

=== Kac–Moody algebras ===
Since strings can have an infinite number of modes, the symmetry used to describe string theory is based on infinite dimensional Lie algebras. Some Kac–Moody algebras that have been considered as symmetries for M-theory have been E_{10} and E_{11} and their supersymmetric extensions.

== See also ==
- AdS/CFT correspondence
- dS/CFT correspondence
- Grand unification theory
- List of string theory topics
- String field theory
