= Type II string theory =

Aspect of theoretical physics

In theoretical physics, type II string theory is a unified term that includes both type IIA strings and type IIB strings theories. Type II string theory accounts for two of the five consistent superstring theories in ten dimensions. Both theories have $\mathcal{N}=2$ extended supersymmetry which is maximal amount of supersymmetry — namely 32 supercharges — in ten dimensions. Both theories are based on oriented closed strings. On the worldsheet, they differ only in the choice of GSO projection. They were first discovered by Michael Green and John Henry Schwarz in 1982, with the terminology of type I and type II coined to classify the three string theories known at the time.

== Type IIA string theory ==
At low energies, type IIA string theory is described by type IIA supergravity in ten dimensions which is a non-chiral theory (i.e. left–right symmetric) with (1,1) d=10 supersymmetry; the fact that the anomalies in this theory cancel is therefore trivial.

In the 1990s it was realized by Edward Witten (building on previous insights by Michael Duff, Paul Townsend, and others) that the limit of type IIA string theory in which the string coupling goes to infinity becomes a new 11-dimensional theory called M-theory. Consequently the low energy type IIA supergravity theory can also be derived from the unique maximal supergravity theory in 11 dimensions (low energy version of M-theory) via a dimensional reduction.

The content of the massless sector of the theory (which is relevant in the low energy limit) is given by $(8_v \oplus 8_s) \otimes (8_v \oplus 8_c)$ representation of SO(8) where $8_v$ is the irreducible vector representation, $8_c$ and $8_s$ are the irreducible representations with odd and even eigenvalues of the fermionic parity operator often called co-spinor and spinor representations. These three representations enjoy a triality symmetry which is evident from its Dynkin diagram. The four sectors of the massless spectrum after GSO projection and decomposition into irreducible representations are

$\text{NS-NS}:~ 8_v \otimes 8_v = 1 \oplus 28\oplus 35= \Phi \oplus B_{\mu\nu} \oplus G_{\mu\nu}$

$\text{NS-R}: 8_v\otimes 8_c=8_s\oplus 56_c=\lambda^+ \oplus \psi_m^-$

$\text{R-NS}: 8_c\otimes 8_s=8_s\oplus 56_s=\lambda^-\oplus \psi_m^+$

$\text{R-R}: 8_s\otimes 8_c=8_v\oplus 56_t=C_n \oplus C_{nmp}$

where $\text{R}$ and $\text{NS}$ stands for Ramond and Neveu–Schwarz sectors respectively. The numbers denote the dimension of the irreducible representation and equivalently the number of components of the corresponding fields. The various massless fields obtained are the graviton $G_{\mu\nu}$ with two superpartner gravitinos $\psi_m^\pm$ which gives rise to local spacetime supersymmetry, a scalar dilaton $\Phi$ with two superpartner spinors—the dilatinos $\lambda^\pm$, a 2-form spin-2 gauge field $B_{\mu\nu}$ often called the Kalb–Ramond field, a 1-form $C_n$ and a 3-form $C_{nmp}$. Since the $\text{p}$-form gauge fields naturally couple to extended objects with $\text{p+1}$ dimensional world-volume, Type IIA string theory naturally incorporates various extended objects like D0, D2, D4 and D6 branes (using Hodge duality) among the D-branes (which are $\text{R}$$\text{R}$ charged) and F1 string and NS5 brane among other objects.

The mathematical treatment of type IIA string theory belongs to symplectic topology and algebraic geometry, particularly Gromov–Witten invariants.

== Type IIB string theory ==
At low energies, type IIB string theory is described by type IIB supergravity in ten dimensions which is a chiral theory (left–right asymmetric) with (2,0) d=10 supersymmetry; the fact that the anomalies in this theory cancel is therefore nontrivial.The mathematical treatment of type IIB string theory belongs to algebraic geometry, specifically the deformation theory of complex structures originally studied by Kunihiko Kodaira and Donald C. Spencer.

In the 1990s it was realized that type IIB string theory with the string coupling constant g is equivalent to the same theory with the coupling 1/g. This equivalence is known as S-duality. Orientifold of type IIB string theory leads to type I string theory. In 1997 Juan Maldacena gave some arguments indicating that type IIB string theory is equivalent to N = 4 supersymmetric Yang–Mills theory in the 't Hooft limit; it was the first suggestion concerning the AdS/CFT correspondence. Type IIB string theory is also obtained as a compactification of F-theory on one space and one time dimension.

A famous result is that the string theory landscape is estimated in type IIB string theory to contain around 10^{500} distinct compactified vacua. Modern estimates predict that the full F-theory landscape is much larger, around 10^{272000}.

== Relationship between the type II theories ==
In the late 1980s, it was realized that type IIA string theory is related to type IIB string theory by T-duality.

== See also ==
- Superstring theory
- Type I string
- Heterotic string
