= S-duality =

Equivalence of two physical theories

In theoretical physics, S-duality (short for strong–weak duality, or Sen duality) is an equivalence of two physical theories, which may be either quantum field theories or string theories developed by Ashoke Sen. S-duality is useful for doing calculations in theoretical physics because it relates a theory in which calculations are difficult to a theory in which they are easier.

In quantum field theory, S-duality generalizes a well established fact from classical electrodynamics, namely the invariance of Maxwell's equations under the interchange of electric and magnetic fields. One of the earliest known examples of S-duality in quantum field theory is Montonen–Olive duality which relates two versions of a quantum field theory called N = 4 supersymmetric Yang–Mills theory. Recent work of Anton Kapustin and Edward Witten suggests that Montonen–Olive duality is closely related to a research program in mathematics called the geometric Langlands program. Another realization of S-duality in quantum field theory is Seiberg duality, which relates two versions of a theory called N=1 supersymmetric Yang–Mills theory.

There are also many examples of S-duality in string theory. The existence of these string dualities implies that seemingly different formulations of string theory are actually physically equivalent. This led to the realization, in the mid-1990s, that all of the five consistent superstring theories are just different limiting cases of a single eleven-dimensional theory called M-theory.

== Overview ==
In quantum field theory and string theory, a coupling constant is a number that controls the strength of interactions in the theory. For example, the strength of gravity is described by a number called Newton's constant, which appears in Newton's law of gravity and also in the equations of Albert Einstein's general theory of relativity. Similarly, the strength of the electromagnetic force is described by a coupling constant, which is related to the charge carried by a single proton.

To compute observable quantities in quantum field theory or string theory, physicists typically apply the methods of perturbation theory. In perturbation theory, quantities called probability amplitudes, which determine the probability for various physical processes to occur, are expressed as sums of infinitely many terms, where each term is proportional to a power of the coupling constant $g$:

$$A=A_0+A_1g+A_2g^2+A_3g^3+\dots$$.

In order for such an expression to make sense, the coupling constant must be less than 1 so that the higher powers of $g$ become negligibly small and the sum is finite. If the coupling constant is not less than 1, then the terms of this sum will grow larger and larger, and the expression gives a meaningless infinite answer. In this case the theory is said to be strongly coupled, and one cannot use perturbation theory to make predictions.

For certain theories, S-duality provides a way of doing computations at strong coupling by translating these computations into different computations in a weakly coupled theory. S-duality is a particular example of a general notion of duality in physics. The term duality refers to a situation where two seemingly different physical systems turn out to be equivalent in a nontrivial way. If two theories are related by a duality, it means that one theory can be transformed in some way so that it ends up looking just like the other theory. The two theories are then said to be dual to one another under the transformation. Put differently, the two theories are mathematically different descriptions of the same phenomena.

S-duality is useful because it relates a theory with coupling constant $g$ to an equivalent theory with coupling constant $1/g$. Thus it relates a strongly coupled theory (where the coupling constant $g$ is much greater than 1) to a weakly coupled theory (where the coupling constant $1/g$ is much less than 1 and computations are possible). For this reason, S-duality is called a strong-weak duality.

== In quantum field theory ==
=== A symmetry of Maxwell's equations ===
In classical physics, the behavior of the electric and magnetic field is described by a system of equations known as Maxwell's equations. Working in the language of vector calculus and assuming that no electric charges or currents are present, these equations can be written

$$\begin{align}
\nabla \cdot \mathbf{E} &= 0, \\
\nabla \cdot \mathbf{B} &= 0, \\
\nabla \times \mathbf{E} &= -\frac{\partial\mathbf B}{\partial t}, \\
\nabla \times \mathbf{B} &= \frac{1}{c^2} \frac{\partial \mathbf E}{\partial t}.
\end{align}$$

Here $\mathbf{E}$ is a vector (or more precisely a vector field whose magnitude and direction may vary from point to point in space) representing the electric field, $\mathbf{B}$ is a vector representing the magnetic field, $t$ is time, and $c$ is the speed of light. The other symbols in these equations refer to the divergence and curl, which are concepts from vector calculus.

An important property of these equations is their invariance under the transformation that simultaneously replaces the electric field $\mathbf{E}$ by the magnetic field $\mathbf{B}$ and replaces $\mathbf{B}$ by $-1/c^2\mathbf{E}$:

$$\begin{align}
\mathbf{E} &\rightarrow\mathbf{B} \\
\mathbf{B} &\rightarrow -\frac{1}{c^2}\mathbf{E}.
\end{align}$$

In other words, given a pair of electric and magnetic fields that solve Maxwell's equations, it is possible to describe a new physical setup in which these electric and magnetic fields are essentially interchanged, and the new fields will again give a solution of Maxwell's equations. This situation is the most basic manifestation of S-duality in a field theory.

=== Montonen–Olive duality ===
In quantum field theory, the electric and magnetic fields are unified into a single entity called the electromagnetic field, and this field is described by a special type of quantum field theory called a gauge theory or Yang–Mills theory. In a gauge theory, the physical fields have a high degree of symmetry which can be understood mathematically using the notion of a Lie group. This Lie group is known as the gauge group. The electromagnetic field is described by a very simple gauge theory corresponding to the abelian gauge group U(1), but there are other gauge theories with more complicated non-abelian gauge groups.

It is natural to ask whether there is an analog in gauge theory of the symmetry interchanging the electric and magnetic fields in Maxwell's equations. The answer was given in the late 1970s by Claus Montonen and David Olive, building on earlier work of Peter Goddard, Jean Nuyts, and Olive. Their work provides an example of S-duality now known as Montonen–Olive duality. Montonen–Olive duality applies to a very special type of gauge theory called N = 4 supersymmetric Yang–Mills theory, and it says that two such theories may be equivalent in a certain precise sense. If one of the theories has a gauge group $G$, then the dual theory has gauge group ${^L}G$ where ${^L}G$ denotes the Langlands dual group which is in general different from $G$.

An important quantity in quantum field theory is complexified coupling constant. This is a complex number defined by the formula

$$\tau=\frac{\theta}{2\pi}+\frac{4\pi i}{g^2}$$

where $\theta$ is the theta angle, a quantity appearing in the Lagrangian that defines the theory, and $g$ is the coupling constant. For example, in the Yang–Mills theory that describes the electromagnetic field, this number $g$ is simply the elementary charge $e$ carried by a single proton. In addition to exchanging the gauge groups of the two theories, Montonen–Olive duality transforms a theory with complexified coupling constant $\tau$ to a theory with complexified constant $-1/\tau$.

=== Relation to the Langlands program ===
The geometric Langlands correspondence is a relationship between abstract geometric objects associated to an algebraic curve such as the elliptic curves illustrated above.

In mathematics, the classical Langlands correspondence is a collection of results and conjectures relating number theory to the branch of mathematics known as representation theory. Formulated by Robert Langlands in the late 1960s, the Langlands correspondence is related to important conjectures in number theory such as the Taniyama–Shimura conjecture, which includes Fermat's Last Theorem as a special case.

In spite of its importance in number theory, establishing the Langlands correspondence in the number theoretic context has proved extremely difficult. As a result, some mathematicians have worked on a related conjecture known as the geometric Langlands correspondence. This is a geometric reformulation of the classical Langlands correspondence which is obtained by replacing the number fields appearing in the original version by function fields and applying techniques from algebraic geometry.

In a paper from 2007, Anton Kapustin and Edward Witten suggested that the geometric Langlands correspondence can be viewed as a mathematical statement of Montonen–Olive duality. Starting with two Yang–Mills theories related by S-duality, Kapustin and Witten showed that one can construct a pair of quantum field theories in two-dimensional spacetime. By analyzing what this dimensional reduction does to certain physical objects called D-branes, they showed that one can recover the mathematical ingredients of the geometric Langlands correspondence. Their work shows that the Langlands correspondence is closely related to S-duality in quantum field theory, with possible applications in both subjects.

=== Seiberg duality ===
Another realization of S-duality in quantum field theory is Seiberg duality, first introduced by Nathan Seiberg around 1995. Unlike Montonen–Olive duality, which relates two versions of the maximally supersymmetric gauge theory in four-dimensional spacetime, Seiberg duality relates less symmetric theories called N=1 supersymmetric gauge theories. The two N=1 theories appearing in Seiberg duality are not identical, but they give rise to the same physics at large distances. Like Montonen–Olive duality, Seiberg duality generalizes the symmetry of Maxwell's equations that interchanges electric and magnetic fields.

== In string theory ==
A diagram of string theory dualities. Blue edges indicate S-duality. Red edges indicate T-duality.

Up until the mid 1990s, physicists working on string theory believed there were five distinct versions of the theory: type I, type IIA, type IIB, and the two flavors of heterotic string theory (SO(32) and E_{8}×E_{8}). The different theories allow different types of strings, and the particles that arise at low energies exhibit different symmetries.

In the mid 1990s, physicists noticed that these five string theories are actually related by highly nontrivial dualities. One of these dualities is S-duality. The term S-duality introduced by Anamaría Font, Luis E. Ibáñez, Dieter Lüst and Fernando Quevedo in 1990. It was shown that type IIB string theory with the coupling constant $g$ is equivalent via S-duality to the same string theory with the coupling constant $1/g$. Similarly, type I string theory with the coupling $g$ is equivalent to the SO(32) heterotic string theory with the coupling constant $1/g$.

The existence of these dualities showed that the five string theories were in fact not all distinct theories. In 1995, at the string theory conference at University of Southern California, Edward Witten made the surprising suggestion that all five of these theories were just different limits of a single theory now known as M-theory. Witten's proposal was based on the observation that type IIA and E_{8}×E_{8} heterotic string theories are closely related to a gravitational theory called eleven-dimensional supergravity. His announcement led to a flurry of work now known as the second superstring revolution.

== See also ==
- Montonen–Olive duality
- Nielsen–Olesen vortex
- Dual graviton
- T-duality
- Mirror symmetry
- AdS/CFT correspondence
