= Heterotic string theory =

Physics concept of subatomic structure

In string theory, a heterotic string is a closed string (or loop) which is a hybrid ('heterotic') of a superstring and a bosonic string. There are two kinds of heterotic superstring theories, the heterotic SO(32) and the heterotic E_{8} × E_{8}, abbreviated to HO and HE. Apart from that there exist seven more heterotic string theories which are not supersymmetric and hence are only of secondary importance in most applications. Heterotic string theory was first developed in 1985 by David Gross, Jeffrey Harvey, Emil Martinec, and Ryan Rohm (the so-called "Princeton string quartet"), in one of the key papers that fueled the first superstring revolution.

== Overview ==
In string theory, the left-moving and the right-moving excitations of strings are completely decoupled for a closed string, and it is possible to construct a string theory whose left-moving (counter-clockwise) excitations are treated as a bosonic string propagating in D = 26 dimensions, while the right-moving (clockwise) excitations are treated as a superstring in D = 10 dimensions.

The mismatched 16 dimensions must be compactified on an even, self-dual lattice (a discrete subgroup of a linear space). There are two possible even self-dual lattices in 16 dimensions, and it leads to two types of the heterotic string. They differ by the gauge group in 10 dimensions. One gauge group is SO(32) (the HO string) while the other is E_{8} × E_{8} (the HE string).

These two gauge groups also turned out to be the only two anomaly-free gauge groups that can be coupled to the N = 1 supergravity in 10 dimensions. (Although not realized for quite some time, U(1)^{496} and E_{8} × U(1)^{248} are anomalous.)

Every heterotic string must be a closed string, not an open string; it is not possible to define any boundary conditions that would relate the left-moving and the right-moving excitations because they have a different character.

== String duality ==
String duality is a class of symmetries in physics that link different string theories. In the 1990s, it was realized that the strong coupling limit of the HO theory is type I string theory — a theory that also contains open strings; this relation is called S-duality. The HO and HE theories are also related by T-duality.

Because the various superstring theories were shown to be related by dualities, it was proposed that each type of string was a different limit of a single underlying theory called M-theory.
