= Type I string theory =

Aspect of theoretical physics

In theoretical physics, type I string theory is one of five consistent supersymmetric string theories in ten dimensions. It is the only one whose strings are unoriented (both orientations of a string are equivalent) and the only one which perturbatively contains not only closed strings, but also open strings. The terminology of type I and type II was coined by John Henry Schwarz in 1982 to classify the three string theories known at the time.

== Overview ==
The classic 1976 work of Ferdinando Gliozzi, Joël Scherk and David Olive paved the way to a systematic understanding of the rules behind string spectra in cases where only closed strings are present via modular invariance. It did not lead to similar progress for models with open strings, despite the fact that the original discussion was based on the type I string theory.

As first proposed by Augusto Sagnotti in 1988, the type I string theory can be obtained as an orientifold of type IIB string theory, with 32 half-D9-branes added in the vacuum to cancel various anomalies giving it a gauge group of SO(32) via Chan–Paton factors.

At low energies, type I string theory is described by the type I supergravity in ten dimensions coupled to the SO(32) supersymmetric Yang–Mills theory. The discovery in 1984 by Michael Green and John H. Schwarz that anomalies in type I string theory cancel sparked the first superstring revolution. However, a key property of these models, shown by A. Sagnotti in 1992, is that in general the Green–Schwarz mechanism takes a more general form, and involves several two forms in the cancellation mechanism.

The relation between the type IIB string theory and the type I string theory has a large number of surprising consequences, both in ten and in lower dimensions, that were first displayed by the String Theory Group at the University of Rome Tor Vergata in the early 1990s. It opened the way to the construction of entire new classes of string spectra with or without supersymmetry. Joseph Polchinski's work on D-branes provided a geometrical interpretation for these results in terms of extended objects (D-brane, orientifold).

In the 1990s it was first argued by Edward Witten that type I string theory with the string coupling constant $g$ is equivalent to the SO(32) heterotic string with the coupling $1/g$. This equivalence is known as S-duality.
