= D-brane =

Extended objects found in string theory

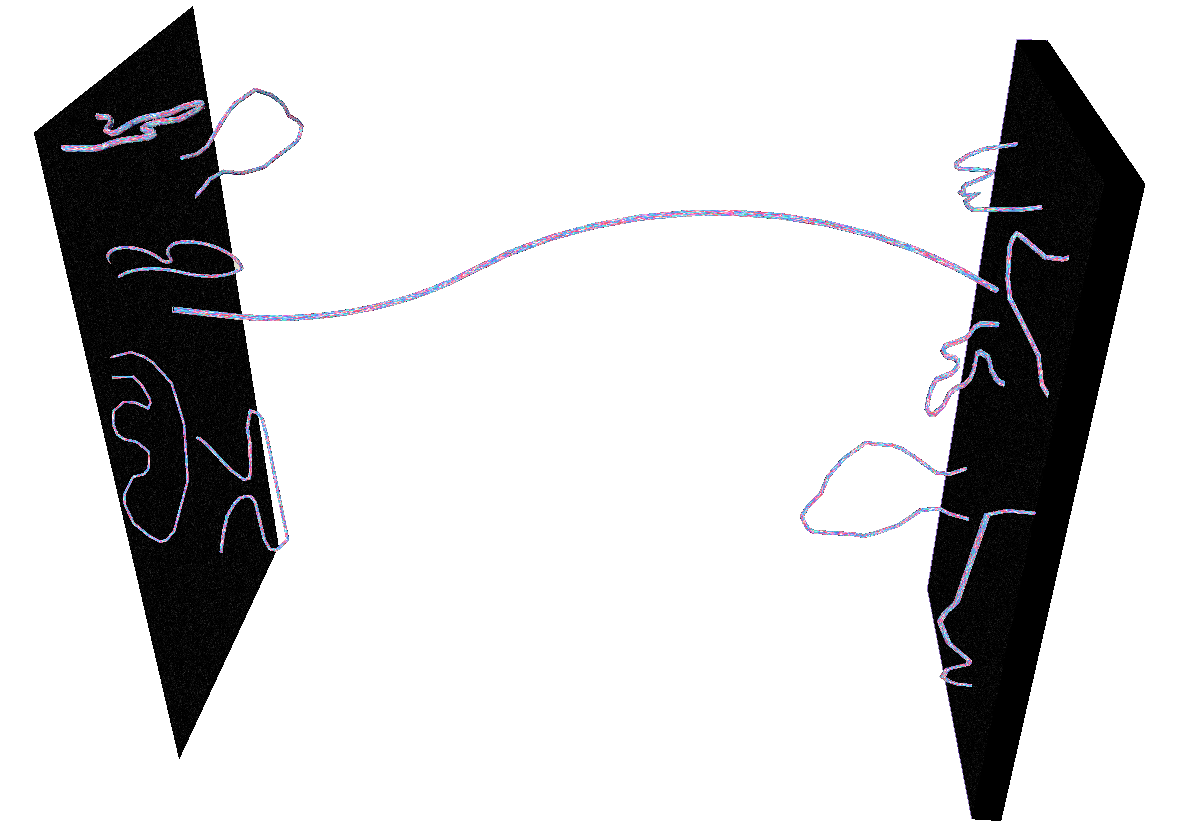
D3-brane & D2-brane

In string theory, D-branes, short for Dirichlet membrane, are a class of extended objects upon which open strings can end with Dirichlet boundary conditions, after which they are named. D-branes are typically classified by their spatial dimension, which is indicated by a number written after the D. A D0-brane is a single point, a D1-brane is a line (sometimes called a "D-string"), a D2-brane is a plane, and a D25-brane fills the highest-dimensional space considered in bosonic string theory. There are also instantonic D(−1)-branes, which are localized in both space and time.

== Discovery ==
D-branes were proposed by Jin Dai, Robert Leigh, and Joseph Polchinski, and independently by Petr Hořava, in 1989. In 1995, Polchinski identified D-branes with black p-brane solutions of supergravity, a discovery that triggered the second superstring revolution and led to both holographic and M-theory dualities.

== Theoretical background ==
The equations of motion of string theory require that the endpoints of an open string (a string with endpoints) satisfy one of two types of boundary conditions: The Neumann boundary condition, corresponding to free endpoints moving through spacetime at the speed of light, or the Dirichlet boundary conditions, which pin the string endpoint. Each coordinate of the string must satisfy one or the other of these conditions. There can also exist strings with mixed boundary conditions, where the two endpoints satisfy NN, DD, ND and DN boundary conditions. If p spatial dimensions satisfy the Neumann boundary condition, then the string endpoint is confined to move within a p-dimensional hyperplane. This hyperplane provides one description of a Dp-brane.

Although rigid in the limit of zero coupling, the spectrum of open strings ending on a D-brane contains modes associated with its fluctuations, implying that D-branes are dynamical objects. When $N$ D-branes are nearly coincident, the spectrum of strings stretching between them becomes very rich. One set of modes produce a non-abelian gauge theory on the world-volume. Another set of modes is an $N \times N$ dimensional matrix for each transverse dimension of the brane. If these matrices commute, they may be diagonalized, and the eigenvalues define the position of the $N$ D-branes in space. More generally, the branes are described by non-commutative geometry, which allows exotic behavior such as the Myers effect, in which a collection of Dp-branes expand into a D(p+2)-brane.

Tachyon condensation is a central concept in this field. Ashoke Sen has argued that in Type IIB string theory, tachyon condensation allows (in the absence of Neveu-Schwarz 3-form flux) an arbitrary D-brane configuration to be obtained from a stack of D9 and anti D9-branes. Edward Witten has shown that such configurations will be classified by the K-theory of the spacetime. Tachyon condensation is still very poorly understood. This is due to the lack of an exact string field theory that would describe the off-shell evolution of the tachyon.

== Braneworld cosmology ==
This has implications for physical cosmology. Because string theory implies that the Universe has more dimensions than we expect—26 for bosonic string theories and 10 for superstring theories—we have to find a reason why the extra dimensions are not apparent. One possibility would be that the visible Universe is in fact a very large D-brane extending over three spatial dimensions. Material objects, made of open strings, are bound to the D-brane, and cannot move "at right angles to reality" to explore the Universe outside the brane. This scenario is called a brane cosmology. The force of gravity is not due to open strings; the gravitons which carry gravitational forces are vibrational states of closed strings. Because closed strings do not have to be attached to D-branes, gravitational effects could depend upon the extra dimensions orthogonal to the brane.

== D-brane scattering ==
When two D-branes approach each other the interaction is captured by the one loop annulus amplitude of strings between the two branes. The scenario of two parallel branes approaching each other at a constant velocity can be mapped to the problem of two stationary branes that are rotated relative to each other by some angle. The annulus amplitude yields singularities that correspond to the on-shell production of open strings stretched between the two branes. This is true irrespective of the charge of the D-branes. At non-relativistic scattering velocities the open strings may be described by a low-energy effective action that contains two complex scalar fields that are coupled via a term $\phi^2\chi^2$. Thus, as the field $\phi$ (separation of the branes) changes, the mass of the field $\chi$ changes. This induces open string production and as a result the two scattering branes will be trapped.

== Gauge theories ==
The arrangement of D-branes constricts the types of string states which can exist in a system. For example, if we have two parallel D2-branes, we can easily imagine strings stretching from brane 1 to brane 2 or vice versa. (In most theories, strings are oriented objects: each one carries an "arrow" defining a direction along its length.) The open strings permissible in this situation then fall into two categories, or "sectors": those originating on brane 1 and terminating on brane 2, and those originating on brane 2 and terminating on brane 1. Symbolically, we say we have the [1 2] and the [2 1] sectors. In addition, a string may begin and end on the same brane, giving [1 1] and [2 2] sectors. (The numbers inside the brackets are called Chan–Paton indices, but they are really just labels identifying the branes.) A string in either the [1 2] or the [2 1] sector has a minimum length: it cannot be shorter than the separation between the branes. All strings have some tension, against which one must pull to lengthen the object; this pull does work on the string, adding to its energy. Because string theories are by nature relativistic, adding energy to a string is equivalent to adding mass, by Einstein's relation E = mc^{2}. Therefore, the separation between D-branes controls the minimum mass open strings may have.

Furthermore, affixing a string's endpoint to a brane influences the way the string can move and vibrate. Because particle states "emerge" from the string theory as the different vibrational states the string can experience, the arrangement of D-branes controls the types of particles present in the theory. The simplest case is the [1 1] sector for a Dp-brane, that is to say the strings which begin and end on any particular D-brane of p dimensions. Examining the consequences of the Nambu–Goto action (and applying the rules of quantum mechanics to quantize the string), one finds that among the spectrum of particles is one resembling the photon, the fundamental quantum of the electromagnetic field. The resemblance is precise: a p-dimensional version of the electromagnetic field, obeying a p-dimensional analogue of Maxwell's equations, exists on every Dp-brane.

In this sense, then, one can say that string theory "predicts" electromagnetism: D-branes are a necessary part of the theory if we permit open strings to exist, and all D-branes carry an electromagnetic field on their volume.

Other particle states originate from strings beginning and ending on the same D-brane. Some correspond to massless particles like the photon; also in this group are a set of massless scalar particles. If a Dp-brane is embedded in a spacetime of d spatial dimensions, the brane carries (in addition to its Maxwell field) a set of d − p massless scalars (particles which do not have polarizations like the photons making up light). Intriguingly, there are just as many massless scalars as there are directions perpendicular to the brane; the geometry of the brane arrangement is closely related to the quantum field theory of the particles existing on it. In fact, these massless scalars are Goldstone excitations of the brane, corresponding to the different ways the symmetry of empty space can be broken. Placing a D-brane in a universe breaks the symmetry among locations, because it defines a particular place, assigning a special meaning to a particular location along each of the d − p directions perpendicular to the brane.

The quantum version of Maxwell's electromagnetism is only one kind of gauge theory, a U(1) gauge theory where the gauge group is made of unitary matrices of order 1. D-branes can be used to generate gauge theories of higher order, in the following way:

Consider a group of N separate Dp-branes, arranged in parallel for simplicity. The branes are labeled 1,2,...,N for convenience. Open strings in this system exist in one of many sectors: the strings beginning and ending on some brane i give that brane a Maxwell field and some massless scalar fields on its volume. The strings stretching from brane i to another brane j have more intriguing properties. For starters, it is worthwhile to ask which sectors of strings can interact with one another. One straightforward mechanism for a string interaction is for two strings to join endpoints (or, conversely, for one string to "split down the middle" and make two "daughter" strings). Since endpoints are restricted to lie on D-branes, it is evident that a [1 2] string may interact with a [2 3] string, but not with a [3 4] or a [4 17] one. The masses of these strings will be influenced by the separation between the branes, as discussed above, so for simplicity's sake, we can imagine the branes squeezed closer and closer together until they lie atop one another. If we regard two overlapping branes as distinct objects, then we still have all the sectors we had before, but without the effects due to the brane separations.

The zero-mass states in the open-string particle spectrum for a system of N coincident D-branes yields a set of interacting quantum fields which is exactly a U(N) gauge theory. (The string theory does contain other interactions, but they are only detectable at very high energies.) Gauge theories were not invented starting with bosonic or fermionic strings; they originated from a different area of physics, and have become quite useful in their own right. If nothing else, the relation between D-brane geometry and gauge theory offers a useful pedagogical tool for explaining gauge interactions, even if string theory fails to be the "theory of everything".

== Black holes ==
Another important use of D-branes has been in the study of black holes. Since the 1970s, scientists have debated the problem of black holes having entropy. Consider, as a thought experiment, dropping an amount of hot gas into a black hole. Since the gas cannot escape from the hole's gravitational pull, its entropy would seem to have vanished from the universe. In order to maintain the second law of thermodynamics, one must postulate that the black hole gained whatever entropy the infalling gas originally had. Attempting to apply quantum mechanics to the study of black holes, Stephen Hawking discovered that a hole should emit energy with the characteristic spectrum of thermal radiation. The characteristic temperature of this Hawking radiation is given by
$$T_{\rm H} = \frac{\hbar c^3}{8\pi GM k_\text{B}}  \;\quad(\approx {1.227 \times 10^{23}\; kg \over M}\; K),$$
where $G$ is the Newtonian constant of gravitation, $M$ is the black hole's mass and $k_\text{B}$ is the Boltzmann constant.

Using this expression for the Hawking temperature, and assuming that a zero-mass black hole has zero entropy, one can use thermodynamic arguments to derive the "Bekenstein entropy":
$$S_{\rm B} = \frac{k_\text{B} 4\pi G}{\hbar c} M^2.$$

The Bekenstein entropy is proportional to the black hole mass squared; because the Schwarzschild radius is proportional to the mass, the Bekenstein entropy is proportional to the black hole's surface area. In fact,
$$S_{\rm B} = \frac{A k_B}{4 l_{\rm P}^2},$$
where $l_{\rm P}$ is the Planck length.

The concept of black hole entropy poses some interesting conundrums. In an ordinary situation, a system has entropy when a large number of different "microstates" can satisfy the same macroscopic condition. For example, given a box full of gas, many different arrangements of the gas atoms can have the same total energy. However, a black hole was believed to be a featureless object (in John Wheeler's catchphrase, "Black holes have no hair"). What, then, are the "degrees of freedom" which can give rise to black hole entropy?

String theorists have constructed models in which a black hole is a very long (and hence very massive) string. This model gives rough agreement with the expected entropy of a Schwarzschild black hole, but an exact proof has yet to be found one way or the other. The chief difficulty is that it is relatively easy to count the degrees of freedom quantum strings possess if they do not interact with one another. This is analogous to the ideal gas studied in introductory thermodynamics: the easiest situation to model is when the gas atoms do not have interactions among themselves. Developing the kinetic theory of gases in the case where the gas atoms or molecules experience inter-particle forces (like the van der Waals force) is more difficult. However, a world without interactions is an uninteresting place: most significantly for the black hole problem, gravity is an interaction, and so if the "string coupling" is turned off, no black hole could ever arise. Therefore, calculating black hole entropy requires working in a regime where string interactions exist.

Extending the simpler case of non-interacting strings to the regime where a black hole could exist requires supersymmetry. In certain cases, the entropy calculation done for zero string coupling remains valid when the strings interact. The challenge for a string theorist is to devise a situation in which a black hole can exist which does not "break" supersymmetry. In recent years, this has been done by building black holes out of D-branes. Calculating the entropies of these hypothetical holes gives results which agree with the expected Bekenstein entropy. Unfortunately, the cases studied so far all involve higher-dimensional spaces – D5-branes in nine-dimensional space, for example. They do not directly apply to the familiar case, the Schwarzschild black holes observed in our own universe.

== History ==
Dirichlet boundary conditions and D-branes had a long "pre-history" before their full significance was recognized. A series of 1975–76 papers by Bardeen, Bars, Hanson and Peccei dealt with an early concrete proposal of interacting particles at the ends of strings (quarks interacting with QCD flux tubes), with dynamical boundary conditions for string endpoints where the Dirichlet conditions were dynamical rather than static. Mixed Dirichlet/Neumann boundary conditions were first considered by Warren Siegel in 1976 as a means of lowering the critical dimension of open string theory from 26 or 10 to 4 (Siegel also cites unpublished work by Halpern, and a 1974 paper by Chodos and Thorn, but a reading of the latter paper shows that it is actually concerned with linear dilation backgrounds, not Dirichlet boundary conditions). This paper, though prescient, was little-noted in its time (a 1985 parody by Siegel, "The Super-g String", contains an almost dead-on description of braneworlds). Dirichlet conditions for all coordinates including Euclidean time (defining what are now known as D-instantons) were introduced by Michael Green in 1977 as a means of introducing point-like structure into string theory, in an attempt to construct a string theory of the strong interaction. String compactifications studied by Harvey and Minahan, Ishibashi and Onogi, and Pradisi and Sagnotti in 1987–1989 also employed Dirichlet boundary conditions.

In 1989, Dai, Leigh, Polchinski, and Hořava independently, discovered that T-duality interchanges the usual Neumann boundary conditions with Dirichlet boundary conditions. This result implies that such boundary conditions must necessarily appear in regions of the moduli space of any open string theory. The Dai et al. paper also notes that the locus of the Dirichlet boundary conditions is dynamical, and coins the term Dirichlet-brane (D-brane) for the resulting object (this paper also coins orientifold for another object that arises under string T-duality). A 1989 paper by Leigh showed that D-brane dynamics are governed by the Dirac–Born–Infeld action. D-instantons were extensively studied by Green in the early 1990s, and were shown by Polchinski in 1994 to produce the e^{–1/g} nonperturbative string effects anticipated by Shenker. In 1995 Polchinski showed that D-branes are the sources of electric and magnetic Ramond–Ramond fields that are required by string duality, leading to rapid progress in the nonperturbative understanding of string theory.

== See also ==
- Bogomol'nyi–Prasad–Sommerfield bound
- M-theory
