= String (physics) =

Hypothetical physical entity

In physics, a string is a physical entity postulated in string theory and related subjects. Unlike elementary particles, which are zero-dimensional or point-like by definition, strings are one-dimensional extended entities. Researchers often have an interest in string theories because theories in which the fundamental entities are strings rather than point particles automatically have many properties that some physicists expect to hold in a fundamental theory of physics. Most notably, a theory of strings that evolve and interact according to the rules of quantum mechanics is presumed by some researchers to automatically describe quantum gravity.

== Overview ==
In string theory, the strings may be open (forming a segment with two endpoints) or closed (forming a loop like a circle) and may have other special properties. Prior to 1995, there were five known versions of string theory incorporating the idea of supersymmetry (these five are known as superstring theories) and two versions without supersymmetry known as bosonic string theories, which differed in the type of strings and in other aspects. Today, these different superstring theories are thought to arise as different limiting cases of a single theory called M-theory.

In string theories of particle physics, the strings are very tiny; much smaller than can be observed in today's particle accelerators. The characteristic length scale of strings is typically on the order of the Planck length, about 10^{−35} meter, the scale at which the effects of quantum gravity are believed to become significant. Therefore on much larger length scales, such as the scales visible in physics laboratories, such entities would appear to be zero-dimensional point particles. Strings are able to vibrate as harmonic oscillators, and different vibrational states of the same string are interpreted as different types of particles. In string theories, strings vibrating at different frequencies constitute the multiple fundamental particles found in the current Standard Model of particle physics. Strings are also sometimes studied in nuclear physics where they are used to model flux tubes.

As the string propagates through spacetime, a string sweeps out a two-dimensional surface called its worldsheet. This is analogous to the one-dimensional worldline traced out by a point particle. The physics of a string is described by means of a two-dimensional conformal field theory associated with the worldsheet. The formalism of two-dimensional conformal field theory also has many applications outside of string theory, for example in condensed matter physics and parts of pure mathematics.

== Types of strings ==
=== Closed and open strings ===
Strings can be either open or closed. A closed string is a string that has no end-points, and therefore is topologically equivalent to a circle. An open string, on the other hand, has two end-points and is topologically equivalent to a line interval. Not all string theories contain open strings, but every theory must contain closed strings, as interactions between open strings can always result in closed strings.

The oldest superstring theory containing open strings was type I string theory. However, the developments in string theory in the 1990s have shown that the open strings should always be thought of as ending on a new physical degree of freedom called D-branes, and the spectrum of possibilities for open strings has significantly increased.

Open and closed strings are generally associated with characteristic vibrational modes. One of the vibration modes of a closed string can be identified as the graviton. In certain string theories, the lowest-energy vibration of an open string is a tachyon and can undergo tachyon condensation. Other vibrational modes of open strings exhibit the properties of photons and gluons.

=== Orientation ===
Strings can also possess an orientation, which can be thought of as an internal "arrow" that distinguishes the string from one with the opposite orientation. By contrast, an unoriented string is one with no such arrow on it.

== See also ==
- Brane
- Cosmic strings
- D-brane
- Elementary particle
