= List of string theory topics =

This is a list of string theory topics.

== String theory ==
- Strings
- Nambu–Goto action
- Polyakov action
- Bosonic string theory
- Superstring theory
  - Type I string
  - Type II string
    - Type IIA string theory
    - Type IIB string theory
  - Heterotic string
- N=2 superstring
- M-theory
  - Matrix theory
  - Introduction to M-theory
- F-theory
- String field theory
- Matrix string theory
- Nonlinear sigma model
- Tachyon condensation
- RNS formalism
- String theory landscape
- History of string theory
  - First superstring revolution
  - Second superstring revolution

=== String duality ===
- T-duality
- S-duality
- U-duality
- Montonen–Olive duality
- Mysterious duality

=== Particles and fields ===
- Graviton
- Dilaton
- Tachyon
- Ramond–Ramond field
- Kalb–Ramond field
- Magnetic monopole

=== Branes ===
- D-brane
- S-brane
- Black brane
- Black holes
- Black string
- Brane cosmology
- Quiver diagram
- Hanany–Witten transition

== Supersymmetry ==
- Supergravity
- Superspace
- Lie superalgebra
- Lie supergroup

== Conformal field theory ==
- Two-dimensional conformal field theory
- Virasoro algebra
- Mirror symmetry
- Conformal anomaly
- Conformal algebra
- Superconformal algebra
- Vertex operator algebra
- Loop algebra
- Kac–Moody algebra
- Wess–Zumino–Witten model
- Monstrous moonshine

== Geometry ==
- Kaluza–Klein theory
- Compactification
- Why 10 dimensions?
- Kähler manifold
- Ricci-flat manifold
  - Calabi–Yau manifold
  - Hyperkähler manifold
    - K3 surface
  - G_{2} manifold
  - Spin(7) manifold
- Generalized complex manifold
- Orbifold
- Conifold
- Orientifold
- Moduli space
- Hořava–Witten domain wall
- K-theory (physics)
- Twisted K-theory

== Holography ==
- Holographic principle
- AdS/CFT correspondence

== Gauge theory ==
- Anomalies
- Instantons
- Chern–Simons form
- Bogomol'nyi–Prasad–Sommerfield bound
- Exceptional Lie groups
  - G_{2}, F_{4}, E_{6}, E_{7}, E_{8}
- ADE classification
- Dirac string
- P-form electrodynamics

== People ==
- Mina Aganagić
- Daniele Amati
- Amir Amini
- Husam Qutteina
- Nima Arkani-Hamed
- Paul S. Aspinwall
- Michael Francis Atiyah
- Tom Banks
- David Berenstein
- Jan de Boer
- Raphael Bousso
- Robert Brandenberger
- Curtis Callan
- Eugène Cremmer
- Atish Dabholkar
- Emilio Del Giudice
- Paolo Di Vecchia
- Robbert Dijkgraaf
- Michael Dine
- Jacques Distler
- Louise Dolan
- Michael Douglas
- Michael Duff
- Giorgi Dvali
- Sergio Ferrara
- Willy Fischler
- Daniel Friedan
- Rajesh Gopakumar
- Sylvester James Gates
- Michael Green
- Brian Greene
- David Gross
- Steven Gubser
- Sergei Gukov
- Alan Guth
- Jeffrey Harvey
- Petr Hořava
- Gary Horowitz
- Tasneem Zehra Husain
- Gary Gibbons
- Clifford V. Johnson
- Michio Kaku
- Renata Kallosh
- Theodor Kaluza
- Anton Kapustin
- Igor Klebanov
- Oskar Klein
- Juan Martín Maldacena
- Donald Marolf
- Emil Martinec
- Shiraz Minwalla
- Gregory Moore
- Luboš Motl
- Sunil Mukhi
- Robert Myers
- K. S. Narain
- Horațiu Năstase
- Nikita Nekrasov
- André Neveu
- Dimitri Nanopoulos
- Holger Bech Nielsen
- Peter van Nieuwenhuizen
- David Olive
- Hirosi Ooguri
- Burt Ovrut
- Joseph Polchinski
- Alexander Polyakov
- Arvind Rajaraman
- Lisa Randall
- Seifallah Randjbar-Daemi
- Martin Rocek
- John H. Schwarz
- Nathan Seiberg
- Ashoke Sen
- Suvankar Dutta
- Samson Shatashvili
- Steve Shenker
- Warren Siegel
- Eva Silverstein
- Matthias Staudacher
- Paul Steinhardt
- Andrew Strominger
- Leonard Susskind
- Charles Thorn
- Paul Townsend
- Sandip Trivedi
- Neil Turok
- Cumrun Vafa
- Gabriele Veneziano
- Erik Verlinde
- Herman Verlinde
- Edward Witten
- Tamiaki Yoneya
- Alexander Zamolodchikov
- Alexei Zamolodchikov
- Barton Zwiebach

== See also ==
- Glossary of string theory
