= Type IIB supergravity =

Ten-dimensional supergravity

In supersymmetry, type IIB supergravity is the unique supergravity in ten dimensions with two supercharges of the same chirality. It was first constructed in 1983 by John Schwarz and independently by Paul Howe and Peter West at the level of its equations of motion. While it does not admit a fully covariant action due to the presence of a self-dual field, it can be described by an action if the self-duality condition is imposed by hand on the resulting equations of motion. The other types of supergravity in ten dimensions are type IIA supergravity, which has two supercharges of opposing chirality, and type I supergravity, which has a single supercharge. The theory plays an important role in modern physics since it is the low-energy limit of type IIB string theory.

== History ==
After supergravity was discovered in 1976, there was a concentrated effort to construct the various possible supergravities that were classified in 1978 by Werner Nahm. He showed that there exist three types of supergravity in ten dimensions, later named type I, type IIA and type IIB. While both type I and type IIA can be realised at the level of the action, type IIB does not admit a covariant action. Instead it was first fully described through its equations of motion, derived in 1983 by John Schwartz, and independently by Paul Howe and Peter West. In 1995 it was realised that one can effectively describe the theory using a pseudo-action where the self-duality condition is imposed as an additional constraint on the equations of motion. The main application of the theory is as the low-energy limit of type IIB strings, and so it plays an important role in string theory, type IIB moduli stabilisation, and the AdS/CFT correspondence.

== Theory ==
Ten-dimensional supergravity admits both $\mathcal N=1$ and $\mathcal N=2$ supergravities, which differ by the number of the Majorana–Weyl spinor supercharges that they possess. The type IIB theory has two supercharges of the same chirality, equivalent to a single Weyl supercharge, with it sometimes denoted as the ten-dimensional $\mathcal N=(2,0)$ supergravity. (Note: This theory has two left-handed Majorana–Weyl gravitions, with it being equivalent to the $\mathcal N=(0,2)$ theory that has two right-handed gravitions.) The field content of this theory is given by the ten dimensional $\mathcal N=2$ chiral supermultiplet $(g_{\mu\nu}, B, C_4, C_2, C_0, \psi_\mu, \lambda, \phi)$. Here $g_{\mu\nu}$ is the metric corresponding to the graviton, while $C_p$ are 4-form, 2-form, and 0-form gauge fields. Meanwhile, $B$ is the Kalb–Ramond field and $\phi$ is the dilaton. There is also a single left-handed Weyl gravitino $\psi_\mu$, equivalent to two left-handed Majorana–Weyl gravitinos, and a single right-handed Weyl fermion $\lambda$, also equivalent to two right-handed Majorana–Weyl fermions. The theory does admit a cosmological constant.

=== Algebra ===
The superalgebra for ten-dimensional $\mathcal N=(2,0)$ supersymmetry is given by

$$\{Q^i_\alpha, Q^j_\beta\} = \delta^{ij}(P\gamma^\mu C)_{\alpha \beta}P_\mu + (P\gamma^\mu C)_{\alpha \beta}\tilde Z_\mu^{ij} + \epsilon^{ij}(P\gamma^{\mu\nu\rho}C)_{\alpha \beta}Z_{\mu\nu\rho}$$
$$\ \ \ \ \ \ \ \ \ \ \ \ \ \ \ \ \ + \delta^{ij}(P\gamma^{\mu\nu\rho\sigma\delta}C)_{\alpha \beta}Z_{\mu\nu\rho\sigma\delta} + (P\gamma^{\mu\nu\rho\sigma\delta}C)_{\alpha \beta}(\tilde Z)^{ij}_{\mu\nu\rho\sigma\delta}.$$

Here $Q^i_\alpha$ with $i=1,2$ are the two Majorana–Weyl supercharges of the same chirality. They therefore satisfy the projection relation $PQ^i_\alpha = Q^i_\alpha$ where $P = \tfrac{1}{2}(1 - \gamma_*)$ is the left-handed chirality projection operator and $\gamma_*$ is the ten-dimensional chirality matrix.

The $ij$ matrices allowed on the right-hand side are fixed by the fact that they must be representations of the $\text{SO}(2)$ R-symmetry group of the type IIB theory, which only allows for $\delta^{ij}$, $\epsilon^{ij}$ and trace-free symmetric matrices $Z^{ij}$. Since the anticommutator is symmetric under an exchange of the spinor and $i,j$ indices, the maximally extended superalgebra can only have terms with the same chirality and symmetry property as the anticommutator. The terms are therefore a product of one of the $ij$ matrices with $P\gamma^{\mu_1\cdots \mu_p}C$, where $C$ is the charge conjugation operator. In particular, when the spinor matrix is symmetric, it multiplies $\tilde Z^{ij}$ or $\delta^{ij}$ while when it is antisymmetric it multiplies $\epsilon^{ij}$. In ten dimensions $\gamma^{\mu_1 \cdots \mu_p}C$ is symmetric for $p=1,2$ modulo $4$ and antisymmetric for $p=3,0$ modulo $4$. Since the projection operator $P$ is a sum of the identity and a gamma matrix, this means that the symmetric combination works when $p = 1$ modulo $4$ and the antisymmetric one when $p=3$ modulo $4$. This yields all the central charges found in the superalgebra up to Poincaré duality.

The central charges are each associated to various BPS states that are found in the theory. The $\tilde Z^{ij}$ central charges correspond to the fundamental string and the D1 brane, $Z_{\mu\nu\rho}$ is associated with the D3 brane, while $Z_{\mu\nu\rho\sigma\delta}$ and $\tilde Z^{ij}_{\mu\nu\rho\sigma\delta}$ give three 5-form charges. One is the D5-brane, another the NS5-brane, and the last is associated with the KK monopole.

=== Self-dual field ===
For the supergravity multiplet to have an equal number of bosonic and fermionic degrees of freedom, the four-form $C_4$ has to have 35 degrees of freedom. This is achieved when the corresponding field strength tensor is self-dual $\star \tilde F_5= \tilde F_5$, eliminating half of the degrees of freedom that would otherwise be found in a 4-form gauge field.

This presents a problem when constructing an action since the kinetic term for the self-dual 5-form field vanishes. (Note: This is because the kinetic term has the form $|F_5|^2\sqrt{-g}dx^1\wedge \cdots \wedge dx^{10} = F_5 \wedge \star F_5 = F_5 \wedge F_5 = 0$, which vanishes since $\omega_p \wedge\omega_p = 0$ for p-forms with odd $p$.) The original way around this was to only work at the level of the equations of motion where self-duality is just another equation of motion. While it is possible to formulate a covariant action with the correct degrees of freedom by introducing an auxiliary field and a compensating gauge symmetry, the more common approach is to instead work with a pseudo-action where self-duality is imposed as an additional constraint on the equations of motion. Without this constraint the action cannot be supersymmetric since it does not have an equal number of fermionic and bosonic degrees of freedom. Unlike type IIA supergravity, type IIB supergravity cannot be acquired as a dimensional reduction of a theory in higher dimensions.

=== Pseudo-action ===
The bosonic part of the pseudo-action for type IIB supergravity is given by

$$S_{IIB,\text{bosonic}} = \frac{1}{2\kappa^2} \int d^{10} x \sqrt{-g} e^{-2\phi}\bigg[R + 4 \partial_\mu
\phi \partial^\mu \phi -\frac{1}{2}|H|^2\bigg]$$
$$\ \ \ \ \ \ \ \ \ \ \ \ \ \ \ \ \ \ -\frac{1}{4\kappa^2}\int d^{10}x \sqrt{-g}\big[|F_1|^2+|\tilde F_3|^2+\tfrac{1}{2}|\tilde F_5|^2\big]
-\frac{1}{4\kappa^2}\int C_4 \wedge H \wedge F_3.$$

Here $\tilde F_3 = F_3-C_0 \wedge H$ and $\tilde F_5 = F_5 - \tfrac{1}{2}C_2\wedge H + \tfrac{1}{2}B \wedge F_3$ are modified field strength tensors for the 2-form and 4-form gauge fields, with the resulting Bianchi identity for the 5-form being given by $d\tilde F_5 = H\wedge F_3$. The notation employed for the kinetic terms is $|F_p|^2 = \tfrac{1}{p!} F_{\mu_1\cdots \mu_p}F^{\mu_1\cdots \mu_p}$ where $F_p = dC_{p-1}$ are the regular field strength tensors associated to the gauge fields. Self-duality $\tilde F_5 = \star \tilde F_5$ has to be imposed by hand onto the equations of motion, making this a pseudo-action rather than a regular action.

The first line in the action contains the Einstein–Hilbert action, the dilaton kinetic term, and the Kalb–Ramond field strength tensor $H=dB$. The first term on the second line has the appropriately modified field strength tensors for the three $C_p$ gauge fields, while the last term is a Chern–Simons term. The action is written in the string frame which allows one to equate the fields to type IIB string states. In particular, the first line consists of kinetic terms for the NSNS fields, with these terms being identical to those found in type IIA supergravity. The first integral on the second line meanwhile consists of the kinetic term for the RR fields.

=== Global symmetry ===
Type IIB supergravity has a global noncompact $\text{SL}(2,\mathbb R)$ symmetry. This can be made explicit by rewriting the action into the Einstein frame $g_{\mu\nu}\rightarrow e^{\phi/2}g_{\mu\nu}$ and defining the axio-dilaton complex scalar field $\tau = C_0+ie^{-\phi}$. Introducing the matrix

$$M_{ij} = \frac{1}{\text{Im} \ \tau} \begin{pmatrix} |\tau|^2 & - \text{Re} \ \tau \\ -\text{Re} \ \tau & 1 \end{pmatrix}$$

and combining the two 3-form field strength tensors into a doublet $F_3^i = (H, F_3)$, the action becomes

$$S_{IIB} = \frac{1}{2\kappa^2} \int d^{10}x \sqrt{-g}\bigg[R - \frac{\partial_\mu \tau \partial^\mu \bar \tau}{2(\text{Im} \ \tau)^2} -\frac{1}{12}M_{ij}F_{3,\mu\nu\rho}^i F_3^{j,\mu\nu\rho} -\frac{1}{4}|\tilde F_5|^2\bigg] - \frac{\epsilon_{ij}}{8\kappa^2}\int C_4 \wedge F_3^i \wedge F_3^j.$$

This action is manifestly invariant under the transformation $\Lambda \in \text{SL}(2,\mathbb R)$ which transforms the 3-forms $F^i_3\rightarrow \Lambda^i{}_j F_3^j$ and the axio-dilaton as

$$\tau \rightarrow \frac{a\tau+b}{c\tau+d}, \ \ \ \ \text{where} \ \ \ \Lambda = \begin{pmatrix}d & c \\ b & a\end{pmatrix}.$$

Both the metric and the self-dual field strength tensor are invariant under these transformations. The invariance of the 3-form field strength tensors follows from the fact that $M \rightarrow (\Lambda^{-1})^TM\Lambda^{-1}$.

=== Supersymmetry transformations ===
The equations of motion acquired from the supergravity action are invariant under the following supersymmetry transformations

$$\delta e_\mu{}^a = \bar \epsilon \gamma^a \psi_\mu,$$
$$\delta \psi_\mu = (D_\mu \epsilon - \tfrac{1}{8}H_{\alpha \beta \mu}\gamma^{\alpha \beta}\sigma^3)\epsilon + \tfrac{1}{16}e^\phi \sum_{n=1}^6\frac{{F\!\!\!/}^{(2n-1)}}{(2n-1)!}\gamma_\mu \mathcal P_n \epsilon,$$
$$\delta B_{\mu\nu} = 2\bar \epsilon \sigma^3 \gamma_{[\mu}\psi_{\nu]},$$
$$\delta C^{(2n-2)}_{\mu_1, \cdots \mu_{2n-2}} = -(2n-2)e^{-\phi}\bar \epsilon \mathcal P_n \gamma_{[\mu_1 \cdots \mu_{2n-3}}(\psi_{\mu_{2n-2}]}-\tfrac{1}{2(2n-2)}\gamma_{\mu_{2n-2}]}\lambda)$$
$$\ \ \ \ \ \ \ \ \ \ \ \ \ \ \ \ \ \ \ \ + \tfrac{1}{2}(2n-2)(2n-3)C^{(2n-4)}_{[\mu_1\cdots \mu_{2n-4}}\delta B_{\mu_{2n-3}\mu_{2n-2}]},$$
$$\delta \lambda = ({\partial\!\!\!/}\phi - \tfrac{1}{12}H_{\mu \nu \rho}\gamma^{\mu\nu\rho}\sigma^3)\epsilon + \tfrac{1}{4}e^\phi \sum_{n=1}^6 \frac{n-3}{(2n-1)!}{F\!\!\!/}^{(2n-1)}\mathcal P_n \epsilon,$$
$$\delta \phi =  \tfrac{1}{2} \bar \epsilon \lambda.$$

Here $F_{\mu_1\cdots \mu_p}$ are the field strength tensors associated with the $C^{(p-1)}$ gauge fields, including all their magnetic duals for $p>5$, while ${F\!\!\!/}^{(p)} = F_{\mu_1\cdots \mu_p}\gamma^{\mu_1 \cdots \mu_p}$. Additionally, $\mathcal P_n=\sigma^1$ when $n$ is even and $\mathcal P_n = i\sigma^2$ when it is odd. The type IIB pseudo-action can also be reformulated in a way that treats all RR fluxes equally in the so-called democratic formulation. Here the action is expressed in terms of all even fluxes up to $C_{10}$, with a duality constraint imposed on all of them to get the correct number of degrees of freedom.

== Relation to string theory ==
Type IIB supergravity is the low-energy limit of type IIB string theory. The fields of the supergravity in the string frame are directly related to the different massless states of the string theory. In particular, the metric, Kalb–Ramond field, and dilaton are NSNS fields, while the three $C_p$ p-forms are RR fields. Meanwhile, the gravitational coupling constant is related to the Regge slope through $2\kappa^2 = (2\pi)^7 \alpha'^4$. (Note: In the Einstein frame, the relation to the gravitational coupling constant includes the string coupling $2\kappa^2 = (2\pi)^7 g_s^2\alpha'^4$.)

The global $\text{SL}(2,\mathbb R)$ symmetry of the supergravity is not a symmetry of the full type IIB string theory since it would mix the $B$ and $C_2$ fields. This does not happen in the string theory since one of these is an NSNS field and the other an RR field, with these having different physics, such as the former coupling to strings but the latter not. The symmetry is instead broken to the discrete subgroup $\text{SL}(2,\mathbb Z)\subset \text{SL}(2,\mathbb R)$ which is believed to be a symmetry of the full type IIB string theory.

The quantum theory is anomaly free, with the gravitational anomalies cancelling exactly. In string theory the pseudo-action receives much studied corrections that are classified into two types. The first are quantum corrections in terms of the string coupling and the second are string corrections terms of the Regge slope $\alpha'$. These corrections play an important role in many moduli stabilisation scenarios.

Dimensional reduction of type IIA and type IIB supergravities necessarily results in the same nine-dimensional $\mathcal N=2$ theory since only one superalgebra of this type exists in this dimension. This is closely linked to the T-duality between the corresponding string theories.
