= Type IIA supergravity =

Ten-dimensional supergravity

In supersymmetry, type IIA supergravity is the unique supergravity in ten dimensions with two supercharges of opposite chirality. It was first constructed in 1984 by a dimensional reduction of eleven-dimensional supergravity on a circle. The other supergravities in ten dimensions are type IIB supergravity, which has two supercharges of the same chirality, and type I supergravity, which has a single supercharge. In 1986 a deformation of the theory was discovered which gives mass to one of the fields and is known as massive type IIA supergravity. Type IIA supergravity plays a very important role in string theory as it is the low-energy limit of type IIA string theory.

== History ==
After supergravity was discovered in 1976 with pure 4D $\mathcal N=1$ supergravity, significant effort was devoted to understanding other possible supergravities that can exist with various numbers of supercharges and in various dimensions. The discovery of eleven-dimensional supergravity in 1978 led to the derivation of many lower dimensional supergravities through dimensional reduction of this theory. Using this technique, type IIA supergravity was first constructed in 1984 by three different groups, by F. Giani and M. Pernici, by I.C.G. Campbell and P. West, and by M. Huq and M. A. Namazie. In 1986 it was noticed by L. Romans that there exists a massive deformation of the theory. Type IIA supergravity has since been extensively used to study the low-energy behaviour of type IIA string theory. The terminology of type IIA, type IIB, and type I was coined by J. Schwarz, originally to refer to the three string theories that were known of in 1982.

== Theory ==
Ten dimensions admits both $\mathcal N=1$ and $\mathcal N=2$ supergravity, depending on whether there are one or two supercharges. (Note: This is equivalent to whether there are one or two gravitinos present in the theory.) Since the smallest spinorial representations in ten dimensions are Majorana–Weyl spinors, the supercharges come in two types $Q^\pm$ depending on their chirality, giving three possible supergravity theories. The $\mathcal N=2$ theory formed using two supercharges of opposite chiralities is denoted by $\mathcal N=(1,1)$ and is known as type IIA supergravity.

This theory contains a single multiplet, known as the ten-dimensional $\mathcal N=2$ nonchiral multiplet. The fields in this multiplet are $(g_{\mu\nu}, C_{\mu\nu\rho},B_{\mu\nu},C_\mu,\psi_\mu,\lambda,\phi)$, where $g_{\mu\nu}$ is the metric corresponding to the graviton, while the next three fields are the 3-, 2-, and 1-form gauge fields, with the 2-form being the Kalb–Ramond field. There is also a Majorana gravitino $\psi_\mu$ and a Majorana spinor $\lambda$, both of which decompose into a pair of Majorana–Weyl spinors of opposite chiralities $\psi_\mu = \psi_\mu^++\psi_\mu^-$ and $\lambda = \lambda^++\lambda^-$. Lastly, there a scalar field $\phi$.

This nonchiral multiplet can be decomposed into the ten-dimensional $\mathcal N=1$ multiplet $(g_{\mu\nu}, B_{\mu\nu}, \psi^+_\mu, \lambda^-, \phi)$, along with four additional fields $(C_{\mu\nu\rho}, C_\mu, \psi_\mu^-, \lambda^+)$. (Note: One can flip all the chiralities and still get an equivalent theory.) In the context of string theory, the bosonic fields in the first multiplet consists of NSNS fields while the bosonic fields are all RR fields. The fermionic fields are meanwhile in the NSR sector.

=== Algebra ===
The superalgebra for $\mathcal N=(1,1)$ supersymmetry is given by

$$\{Q_\alpha, Q_\beta\} = (\gamma^\mu C)_{\alpha \beta}P_\mu + (\gamma_* C)_{\alpha \beta}Z + (\gamma^\mu \gamma_* C)_{\alpha \beta}Z_\mu +(\gamma^{\mu\nu}C)_{\alpha \beta}Z_{\mu\nu}$$
$$\ \ \ \ \ \ \ \ \ \ \ \ \ \ \ \ + (\gamma^{\mu\nu\rho\sigma}\gamma_*C)_{\alpha \beta}Z_{\mu\nu\rho\sigma} + (\gamma^{\mu\nu\rho\sigma\delta}C)_{\alpha \beta}Z_{\mu\nu\rho\sigma \delta},$$

where all terms on the right-hand side besides the first one are the central charges allowed by the theory. Here $Q_\alpha$ are the spinor components of the Majorana supercharges (Note: The Majorana supercharges decompose into two Majorana–Weyl spinors of opposite chiralities $Q = Q^++Q^-$.) while $C$ is the charge conjugation operator. Since the anticommutator is symmetric, the only matrices allowed on the right-hand side are ones that are symmetric in the spinor indices $\alpha$, $\beta$. In ten dimensions $\gamma^{\mu_1\cdots \mu_p}C$ is symmetric only for $p=1,2$ modulo $4$, with the chirality matrix $\gamma_*$ behaving as just another $\gamma$ matrix, except with no index. Going only up to five-index matrices, since the rest are equivalent up to Poincaré duality, yields the set of central charges described by the above algebra.

The various central charges in the algebra correspond to different BPS states allowed by the theory. In particular, the $Z$, $Z_{\mu\nu}$ and $Z_{\mu\nu\rho\sigma}$ correspond to the D0, D2, and D4 branes. The $Z_\mu$ corresponds to the NSNS 1-brane, which is equivalent to the fundamental string, while $Z_{\mu\nu\rho\sigma\delta}$ corresponds to the NS5-brane.

=== Action ===
The type IIA supergravity action is given up to four-fermion terms by

$$S_{IIA,\text{bosonic}} = \frac{1}{2\kappa^2} \int d^{10} x \sqrt{-g} e^{-2\phi}\bigg[R + 4 \partial_\mu
\phi \partial^\mu \phi -\frac{1}{12}H_{\mu\nu\rho}H^{\mu\nu\rho} - 2 \bar \psi_\mu \gamma^{\mu\nu\rho}D_\nu \psi_\rho + 2 \bar \lambda \gamma^\mu D_\mu \lambda \bigg]$$
$$\ \ \ \ \ \ \ \ \ \ \ \ \ \ \ \ \ \ -\frac{1}{4\kappa^2}\int d^{10}x \sqrt{-g}\big[\tfrac{1}{2}F_{2,\mu\nu}F^{\mu\nu}_2+\tfrac{1}{24}\tilde F_{4,\mu\nu\rho\sigma}\tilde F^{\mu\nu\rho\sigma}_4\big]
-\frac{1}{4\kappa^2}\int B \wedge F_4 \wedge F_4$$
$$\ \ \ \ \ \ \ \ \ \ \ \ \ \ \ \ \ \ +\frac{1}{2\kappa^2}\int d^{10}x \sqrt{-g} \bigg[e^{-2\phi}(2 \chi^\mu_1 \partial_\mu \phi - \tfrac{1}{6} H_{\mu\nu\rho} \chi_3^{\mu\nu\rho} - 4 \bar \lambda \gamma^{\mu\nu}D_\mu \psi_\nu) - \tfrac{1}{2}F_{2,\mu\nu} \Psi_2^{\mu\nu} - \tfrac{1}{24}\tilde F_{4,\mu\nu\rho\sigma} \Psi_4^{\mu\nu\rho\sigma} \bigg].$$

Here $H = dB$ and $F_{p+1}=dC_p$ where $p$ corresponds to a $p$-form gauge field. (Note: Sometimes the notation $|F_p|^2 = \tfrac{1}{p!} F_{\mu_1\cdots \mu_p}F^{\mu_1\cdots \mu_p}$ is used to write the canonically normalized kinetic term for the gauge fields.) The 3-form gauge field has a modified field strength tensor $\tilde F_4 = F_4 -A_1\wedge F_3$ with this having a non-standard Bianchi identity of $d\tilde F_4 = -F_2\wedge F_3$. (Note: The Bianchi identity for the other field-strength tensors is simply $dF_p=0$.) Meanwhile, $\chi_1^\mu$, $\chi_3^{\mu\nu\rho}$, $\Psi_2^{\mu\nu}$, and $\Psi_4^{\mu\nu\rho\sigma}$ are various fermion bilinears given by

$$\chi^\mu_1 = -2\bar \psi_\nu \gamma^\nu \psi^\mu - 2\bar \lambda \gamma^\nu \gamma^\mu \psi_\nu,$$
$$\chi^{\mu\nu\rho}_3 = \tfrac{1}{2}\bar \psi^\alpha \gamma_{[\alpha}\gamma^{\mu\nu\rho}\gamma_{\beta]}\gamma_* \psi^\beta + \bar \lambda \gamma^{\mu\nu\rho}{}_\beta \gamma_* \psi^\beta - \tfrac{1}{2}\bar \lambda \gamma_* \gamma^{\mu\nu\rho}\lambda,$$
$$\Psi^{\mu\nu}_2 = \tfrac{1}{2}e^{-\phi}\bar \psi^\alpha\gamma_{[\alpha}\gamma^{\mu\nu}\gamma_{\beta]}\gamma_*\psi^\beta + \tfrac{1}{2}e^{-\phi}\bar \lambda \gamma^{\mu\nu}\gamma_\beta \gamma_*\psi^\beta + \tfrac{1}{4}e^{-\phi}\bar \lambda \gamma^{\mu\nu}\gamma_*\lambda,$$
$$\Psi^{\mu\nu\rho\sigma}_4 = \tfrac{1}{2}e^{-\phi}\bar \psi^\alpha\gamma_{[\alpha}\gamma^{\mu\nu\rho\sigma}\gamma_{\beta]}\psi^\beta + \tfrac{1}{2}e^{-\phi}\bar \lambda \gamma^{\mu\nu\rho\sigma}\gamma_\beta\psi^\beta - \tfrac{1}{4}e^{-\phi}\bar \lambda \gamma^{\mu\nu\rho\sigma}\lambda.$$

The first line of the action has the Einstein–Hilbert action, the dilaton kinetic term (Note: The dilaton kinetic term appears to not be canonically normalized, but this is because it is in the string frame. Performing a Weyl transformation into the Einstein frame would result in a canonically normalized dilaton kinetic term.), the 2-form $B_{\mu\nu}$ field strength tensor. It also contains the kinetic terms for the gravitino $\psi_\mu$ and spinor $\lambda$, described by the Rarita–Schwinger action and Dirac action, respectively. The second line has the kinetic terms for the 1-form and 3-form gauge fields as well as a Chern–Simons term. The last line contains the cubic interaction terms between two fermions and a boson.

=== Supersymmetry transformations ===
The supersymmetry variations that leave the action invariant are given up to three-fermion terms by (Note: The action and supersymmetry variations depend on the metric signature used. Transforming from a mainily positive signature, denoted by primes, to a mainly negative one used in this article can be done through $g'_{\mu\nu} = - g_{\mu\nu}$ implying that $\gamma'^\mu = i\gamma^\mu$, $\gamma'_\mu = -i\gamma_\mu$, and $\gamma'_{*}=-\gamma_{*}$. Additionally, the fields are often redefined as ${e'}_\mu{}^a=e_\mu{}^a$, ${\psi'}_\mu=\psi_\mu$, $\lambda'=i\lambda$, $B'=-B$, $C_1'=-C_1$, $C'_3=C_3$.)

$$\delta e_\mu{}^a = \bar \epsilon \gamma^a \psi_\mu,$$
$$\delta \psi_\mu = (D_\mu + \tfrac{1}{8}H_{\alpha \beta\mu}\gamma^{\alpha \beta}\gamma_*)\epsilon + \tfrac{1}{16}e^\phi F_{\alpha \beta}\gamma^{\alpha \beta}\gamma_\mu \gamma_* \epsilon + \tfrac{1}{192}e^\phi F_{\alpha \beta \gamma \delta}\gamma^{\alpha \beta \gamma \delta}\gamma_\mu \epsilon,$$
$$\delta B_{\mu\nu} = 2\bar \epsilon \gamma_{*}\gamma_{[\mu}\psi_{\nu]},$$
$$\delta C_\mu = -e^{-\phi}\bar \epsilon\gamma_* (\psi_\mu - \tfrac{1}{2}\gamma_\mu \lambda),$$
$$\delta C_{\mu\nu\rho} = -e^{-\phi}\bar \epsilon\gamma_{[\mu\nu}(3\psi_{\rho]}-\tfrac{1}{2}\gamma_{\rho]}\lambda) + 3 C_{[\mu}\delta B_{\nu \rho]},$$
$$\delta \lambda = ({\partial\!\!\!/} \phi +\tfrac{1}{12}H_{\alpha \beta \gamma}\gamma^{\alpha \beta \gamma}\gamma_*)\epsilon + \tfrac{3}{8}e^\phi F_{\alpha \beta}\gamma^{\alpha \beta}\gamma_* \epsilon + \tfrac{1}{96}e^\phi F_{\alpha \beta \gamma \delta}\gamma^{\alpha \beta \gamma \delta}\epsilon,$$
$$\delta \phi = \tfrac{1}{2}\bar \epsilon \lambda.$$

They are useful for constructing the Killing spinor equations and finding the supersymmetric ground states of the theory since these require that the fermionic variations vanish.

== Related theories ==
=== Massive type IIA supergravity ===
Since type IIA supergravity has p-form field strengths of even dimensions, it also admits a nine-form gauge field $F_{10} = dC_9$. But since $\star F_{10}$ is a scalar and the free field equation is given by $d\star F_{10} = 0$, this scalar must be a constant. Such a field therefore has no propagating degrees of freedom, but does have an energy density associated to it. Working only with the bosonic sector, the ten-form can be included in supergravity by modifying the original action to get massive type IIA supergravity

$$S_{\text{massive }IIA} = \tilde S_{IIA} -\frac{1}{4\kappa^2}\int d^{10}x \sqrt{-g}M^2 + \frac{1}{2\kappa^2}\int MF_{10},$$

where $\tilde S_{IIA}$ is equivalent to the original type IIA supergravity up to the replacement of $F_2 \rightarrow F_2 +MB$ and $F_4 \rightarrow F_4+\tfrac{1}{2}MB\wedge B$. Here $M$ is known as the Romans mass and it acts as a Lagrange multiplier for $F_{10}$. Often one integrates out this field strength tensor resulting in an action where $M$ acts as a mass term for the Kalb–Ramond field.

Unlike in the regular type IIA theory, which has a vanishing scalar potential $V(\phi)=0$, massive type IIA has a nonvanishing scalar potential. As such, this term plays the role of a cosmological constant-like term. This is in contrast to regular type IIA supergravity which does not admit a cosmological constant. While the $\mathcal N=2$ supersymmetry transformations appear to be realised, they are actually formally broken since the theory corresponds to a D8-brane background. A closely related theory is Howe–Lambert–West supergravity which is another massive deformation of type IIA supergravity, (Note: They are the only two massive deformations possible.) but one that can only be described at the level of the equations of motion. It is acquired by a compactification of eleven-dimensional MM theory on a circle.

=== Relation to 11D supergravity ===
Compactification of eleven-dimensional supergravity on a circle and keeping only the zero Fourier modes that are independent of the compact coordinates results in type IIA supergravity. For eleven-dimensional supergravity with the graviton, gravitino, and a 3-form gauge field denoted by $(g_{MN}',\psi_M', A_{MNR}')$, then the 11D metric decomposes into the 10D metric (similar to the Kaluza–Klein metric), the 1-form, and the dilaton as

$$g'_{MN} = e^{-2\phi/3}\begin{pmatrix} g_{\mu\nu}+e^{2\phi}C_\mu C_\nu & -e^{2\phi}C_\mu \\ -e^{2\phi} C_\nu & e^{2\phi}\end{pmatrix}.$$

Meanwhile, the 11D 3-form decomposes into the 10D 3-form $A_{\mu\nu\rho}'\rightarrow C_{\mu\nu\rho}$ and the 10D 2-form $A_{\mu\nu11}' \rightarrow B_{\mu\nu}$. The ten-dimensional modified field strength tensor $\tilde F_4$ directly arises in this compactification from $F'_{\mu\nu\rho\sigma} = e^{4\phi/3}\tilde F_{\mu\nu\rho\sigma}$.

Dimensional reduction of the fermions must generally be done in terms of the flat coordinates $\psi_A' = e_A'^M\psi_M$, where ${e'}^M_A$ is the 11D vielbein. (Note: Using the aforementioned metric, the vielbein can be written in terms of the 10d vielbein, the $C_1$ gauge field, and the dilaton as $${e'}^A_M=\begin{pmatrix} e^{-\phi/3}e^a_\mu & -e^{2\phi/3}C_\mu\\ 0 & e^{2\phi/3}\end{pmatrix}$$. This is a special gauge with ${e'}^A_{11} = 0$, which has to be accounted for when deriving the 10d supersymmetry variations from the 11d ones.) In that case the 11D Majorana graviton decomposes into the 10D Majorana gravitino and the Majorana fermion $\psi_A'\sim (\psi_a, \lambda)$, (Note: Each Majorana spinor decomposes into the two Majorana–Weyl spinors of opposing chirality, with the ten-dimensional chirality matrix being one of the eleven-dimensional gamma matrices $\gamma_* = \gamma_{11}$.) although the exact identification is given by

$$\psi_a' = e^{\phi/6}(2\psi_a - \tfrac{1}{3}\gamma_a \lambda), \ \ \ \ \ \ \ \psi_{11}' = \tfrac{2}{3}e^{\phi/6}\gamma_* \lambda,$$

where this is chosen to make the supersymmetry transformations simpler. (Note: Note that $\psi'_{11}$ is the 11th flat component, not the 11th spacetime component.) The ten-dimensional supersymmetry variations can also be directly acquired from the eleven-dimensional ones by setting $\epsilon' = e^{-\phi/6}\epsilon$. (Note: For example, the 11d vielbein transforms as $\delta e_M'^A = \tfrac{1}{2}\bar \epsilon' \gamma^a\psi_M'$, so using that $e_\mu'^a = e^{-\phi/3}e_\mu^a$ and $\psi'_\mu = e^{-\phi/3}e^{\phi/6}(2\psi_\mu -\tfrac{1}{3}\gamma_\mu \lambda)$, one can get both the supersymmetry variation of the 10d vielbein and the dilatino.)

=== Relation to type IIA string theory ===
The low-energy effective field theory of type IIA string theory is given by type IIA supergravity. The fields correspond to the different massless excitations of the string, with the metric, 2-form $B$, and dilaton being NSNS states that are found in all string theories, while the 3-form and 1-form fields correspond to the RR states of type IIA string theory. Corrections to the type IIA supergravity action come in two types, quantum corrections in powers of the string coupling $g_s$, and curvature corrections in powers of $\alpha'$. Such corrections often play an important role in type IIA string phenomenology. The type IIA superstring coupling constant $g_s$ corresponds to the vacuum expectation value of $e^\phi$, while the string length $l_s = \sqrt{\alpha'}$ is related to the gravitational coupling constant through $2\kappa^2 = (2\pi)^7{\alpha'}^4$.

When string theory is compactified to acquire four-dimensional theories, this is often done at the level of the low-energy supergravity. Reduction of type IIA on a Calabi–Yau manifold yields an $\mathcal N=2$ theory in four dimensions, while reduction on a Calabi–Yau orientifold further breaks the symmetry down to give the phenomenologically viable four-dimensional $\mathcal N=1$ supergravity. Type IIA supergravity is automatically anomaly free since it is a non-chiral theory.
