= K-theory (physics) =

Application of K-theory in string theory

In string theory, K-theory classification refers to a conjectured application of K-theory (in abstract algebra and algebraic topology) to superstrings, to classify the allowed Ramond–Ramond field strengths as well as the charges of stable D-branes.

In condensed matter physics K-theory has also found important applications, specially in the topological classification of topological insulators, superconductors and stable Fermi surfaces (Kitaev (2009), Horava (2005)).

== History ==
This conjecture, applied to D-brane charges, was first proposed by Minasian & Moore (1997). It was popularized by Witten (1998) who demonstrated that in type IIB string theory arises naturally from Ashoke Sen's realization of arbitrary D-brane configurations as stacks of D9 and anti-D9-branes after tachyon condensation.

Such stacks of branes are inconsistent in a non-torsion Neveu–Schwarz (NS) 3-form background, which, as was highlighted by Kapustin (2000), complicates the extension of the K-theory classification to such cases. Bouwknegt & Varghese (2000) suggested a solution to this problem: D-branes are in general classified by a twisted K-theory, that had earlier been defined by Rosenberg (1989).

== Applications ==
The K-theory classification of D-branes has had numerous applications. For example, Hanany & Kol (2000) used it to argue that there are eight species of orientifold one-plane. Uranga (2001) applied the K-theory classification to derive new consistency conditions for flux compactifications. K-theory has also been used to conjecture a formula for the topologies of T-dual manifolds by Bouwknegt, Evslin & Varghese (2004). Recently K-theory has been conjectured to classify the spinors in compactifications on generalized complex manifolds.

=== Open problems ===
Despite these successes, RR fluxes are not quite classified by K-theory. Diaconescu, Moore & Witten (2003) argued that the K-theory classification is incompatible with S-duality in IIB string theory.

In addition, if one attempts to classify fluxes on a compact ten-dimensional spacetime, then a complication arises due to the self-duality of the RR fluxes. The duality uses the Hodge star, which depends on the metric and so is continuously valued and in particular is generically irrational. Thus not all of the RR fluxes, which are interpreted as the Chern characters in K-theory, can be rational. However Chern characters are always rational, and so the K-theory classification must be replaced. One needs to choose a half of the fluxes to quantize, or a polarization in the geometric quantization-inspired language of Diaconescu, Moore, and Witten and later of Varghese & Sati (2004). Alternately one may use the K-theory of a 9-dimensional time slice as has been done by Maldacena, Moore & Seiberg (2001).

== K-theory classification of RR fluxes ==
In the classical limit of type II string theory, which is type II supergravity, the Ramond–Ramond field strengths are differential forms. In the quantum theory the well-definedness of the partition functions of D-branes implies that the RR field strengths obey Dirac quantization conditions when spacetime is compact, or when a spatial slice is compact and one considers only the (magnetic) components of the field strength which lie along the spatial directions. This led twentieth century physicists to classify RR field strengths using cohomology with integral coefficients.

However some authors have argued that the cohomology of spacetime with integral coefficients is too big. For example, in the presence of Neveu–Schwarz H-flux or non-spin cycles some RR fluxes dictate the presence of D-branes. In the former case this is a consequence of the supergravity equation of motion which states that the product of a RR flux with the NS 3-form is a D-brane charge density. Thus the set of topologically distinct RR field strengths that can exist in brane-free configurations is only a subset of the cohomology with integral coefficients.

This subset is still too big, because some of these classes are related by large gauge transformations. In QED there are large gauge transformations which add integral multiples of two pi to Wilson loops. The p-form potentials in type II supergravity theories also enjoy these large gauge transformations, but due to the presence of Chern-Simons terms in the supergravity actions these large gauge transformations transform not only the p-form potentials but also simultaneously the (p+3)-form field strengths. Thus to obtain the space of inequivalent field strengths from the forementioned subset of integral cohomology we must quotient by these large gauge transformations.

The Atiyah–Hirzebruch spectral sequence constructs twisted K-theory, with a twist given by the NS 3-form field strength, as a quotient of a subset of the cohomology with integral coefficients. In the classical limit, which corresponds to working with rational coefficients, this is precisely the quotient of a subset described above in supergravity. The quantum corrections come from torsion classes and contain mod 2 torsion corrections due to the Freed-Witten anomaly.

Thus twisted K-theory classifies the subset of RR field strengths that can exist in the absence of D-branes quotiented by large gauge transformations. Daniel Freed has attempted to extend this classification to include also the RR potentials using differential K-theory.

== K-theory classification of D-branes ==
K-theory classifies D-branes in noncompact spacetimes, intuitively in spacetimes in which we are not concerned about the flux sourced by the brane having nowhere to go. While the K-theory of a 10d spacetime classifies D-branes as subsets of that spacetime, if the spacetime is the product of time and a fixed 9-manifold then K-theory also classifies the conserved D-brane charges on each 9-dimensional spatial slice. While we were required to forget about RR potentials to obtain the K-theory classification of RR field strengths, we are required to forget about RR field strengths to obtain the K-theory classification of D-branes.

=== K-theory charge versus BPS charge ===
As has been stressed by Petr Hořava, the K-theory classification of D-branes is independent of, and in some ways stronger than, the classification of BPS states. K-theory appears to classify stable D-branes missed by supersymmetry based classifications.

For example, D-branes with torsion charges, that is with charges in the order N cyclic group $\mathbf Z_N$, attract each other and so can never be BPS. In fact, N such branes can decay, whereas no superposition of branes that satisfy a Bogomolny bound may ever decay. However the charge of such branes is conserved modulo N, and this is captured by the K-theory classification but not by a BPS classification. Such torsion branes have been applied, for example, to model Douglas-Shenker strings in supersymmetric U(N) gauge theories.

=== K-theory from tachyon condensation ===
Ashoke Sen has conjectured that, in the absence of a topologically nontrivial NS 3-form flux, all IIB brane configurations can be obtained from stacks of spacefilling D9 and anti D9 branes via tachyon condensation. The topology of the resulting branes is encoded in the topology of the gauge bundle on the stack of the spacefilling branes. The topology of the gauge bundle of a stack of D9s and anti D9s can be decomposed into a gauge bundle on the D9's and another bundle on the anti D9's. Tachyon condensation transforms such a pair of bundles to another pair in which the same bundle is direct summed with each component in the pair. Thus the tachyon condensation invariant quantity, that is, the charge which is conserved by the tachyon condensation process, is not a pair of bundles but rather the equivalence class of a pair of bundles under direct sums of the same bundle on both sides of the pair. This is precisely the usual construction of topological K-theory. Thus the gauge bundles on stacks of D9's and anti-D9's are classified by topological K-theory. If Sen's conjecture is right, all D-brane configurations in type IIB are then classified by K-theory. Petr Horava has extended this conjecture to type IIA using D8-branes.

=== Twisted K-theory from MMS instantons ===
While the tachyon condensation picture of the K-theory classification classifies D-branes as subsets of a 10-dimensional spacetime with no NS 3-form flux, the Maldacena, Moore, Seiberg picture classifies stable D-branes with finite mass as subsets of a 9-dimensional spatial slice of spacetime.

The central observation is that D-branes are not classified by integral homology because Dp-branes wrapping certain cycles suffer from a Freed-Witten anomaly, which is cancelled by the insertion of D(p-2)-branes and sometimes D(p-4)-branes that end on the afflicted Dp-brane. These inserted branes may either continue to infinity, in which case the composite object has an infinite mass, or else they may end on an anti-Dp-brane, in which case the total Dp-brane charge is zero. In either case, one may wish to remove the anomalous Dp-branes from the spectrum, leaving only a subset of the original integral cohomology.

The inserted branes are unstable. To see this, imagine that they extend in time away (into the past) from the anomalous brane. This corresponds to a process in which the inserted branes decay via a Dp-brane that forms, wraps the forementioned cycle and then disappears. MMS refer to this process as an instanton, although really it need not be instantonic.

The conserved charges are thus the nonanomolous subset quotiented by the unstable insertions. This is precisely the Atiyah-Hirzebruch spectral sequence construction of twisted K-theory as a set.

== Reconciling twisted K-theory and S-duality ==
Diaconescu, Moore, and Witten have pointed out that the twisted K-theory classification is not compatible with the S-duality covariance of type IIB string theory. For example, consider the constraint on the Ramond–Ramond 3-form field strength G_{3} in the Atiyah-Hirzebruch spectral sequence (AHSS):

$$d_3G_3=Sq^3G_3+H\cup G_3=G_3\cup G_3+H\cup G_3=0$$

where d_{3}=Sq^{3}+H is the first nontrivial differential in the AHSS, Sq^{3} is the third Steenrod square and the last equality follows from the fact that the nth Steenrod square acting on any n-form x is x$\cup$x.

The above equation is not invariant under S-duality, which exchanges G_{3} and H. Instead Diaconescu, Moore, and Witten have proposed the following S-duality covariant extension

$$G_3\cup G_3+H\cup G_3+H\cup H=P$$

where P is an unknown characteristic class that depends only on the topology, and in particular not on the fluxes. Diaconescu, Freed & Moore (2007) have found a constraint on P using the E_{8} gauge theory approach to M-theory pioneered by Diaconescu, Moore, and Witten.

Thus D-branes in IIB are not classified by twisted K-theory after all, but some unknown S-duality-covariant object that inevitably also classifies both fundamental strings and NS5-branes.

However the MMS prescription for calculating twisted K-theory is easily S-covariantized, as the Freed-Witten anomalies respect S-duality. Thus the S-covariantized form of the MMS construction may be applied to construct the S-covariantized twisted K-theory, as a set, without knowing having any geometric description for just what this strange covariant object is. This program has been carried out in a number of papers, such as Evslin & Varadarajan (2003) and Evslin (2003a), and was also applied to the classification of fluxes by Evslin (2003b). Bouwknegt et al. (2006) use this approach to prove Diaconescu, Moore, and Witten's conjectured constraint on the 3-fluxes, and they show that there is an additional term equal to the D3-brane charge. Evslin (2006) shows that the Klebanov-Strassler cascade of Seiberg dualities consists of a series of S-dual MMS instantons, one for each Seiberg duality. The group, $\mathbf Z_N$ of universality classes of the $SU(M+N)\times SU(M)$ supersymmetric gauge theory is then shown to agree with the S-dual twisted K-theory and not with the original twisted K-theory.

Some authors have proposed radically different solutions to this puzzle. For example, Kriz & Sati (2005) propose that instead of twisted K-theory, II string theory configurations should be classified by elliptic cohomology.

== Researchers ==
Prominent researchers in this area include Edward Witten, Peter Bouwknegt, Angel Uranga, Emanuel Diaconescu, Gregory Moore, Anton Kapustin, Jonathan Rosenberg, Ruben Minasian, Amihay Hanany, Hisham Sati, Nathan Seiberg, Juan Maldacena, Alexei Kitaev, Daniel Freed, and Igor Kriz.

== See also ==
- Kalb–Ramond field

== References (condensed matter physics) ==
- Kitaev, Alexei (2009), "Periodic table for topological insulators and superconductors", AIP Conference Proceedings, 1134 (1): 22–30, arXiv:0901.2686, Bibcode:2009AIPC.1134...22K, doi:10.1063/1.3149495, S2CID 14320124.
- Horava, Petr (2005), "Stability of Fermi Surfaces and K Theory", Physical Review Letters, 95 (16405) 016405, arXiv:hep-th/0503006, Bibcode:2005PhRvL..95a6405H, doi:10.1103/physrevlett.95.016405, PMID 16090638, S2CID 15197829.
- Roy, Rahul; Fenner Harper (2017), "Periodic Table for Floquet Topological Insulators", Physical Review B, 96 (15) 155118, arXiv:1603.06944, Bibcode:2017PhRvB..96o5118R, doi:10.1103/PhysRevB.96.155118, S2CID 119270701.
