= Hořava–Witten theory =

In theoretical physics, the Hořava–Witten theory argues that the cancellation of anomalies guarantees that a supersymmetric gauge theory with the E8 gauge group propagates on a type of domain wall. This domain wall, a Hořava–Witten domain wall, behaves as a boundary of the eleven-dimensional spacetime in M-theory. Proposed by Petr Hořava and Edward Witten, the theory is important for various relations between M-theory and superstring theory.

== Background ==
Connection of D = 11 supergravity and five string theories in M theory.

D = 11 supergravity, which is the low energy limit of M theory, compactified over the one-dimensional unit interval $I$ yields heterotic $E_8\times E_8$ string theory and compactified over the one-dimensional sphere $S^1$ yields Type IIA supergravity. This means that for a ten-dimensional smooth manifold $M^{10}$, D = 11 supergravity on $M^{10}\times I$ is equivalent to heterotic $E_8\times E_8$ string theory on $M^{10}$ and D = 11 supergravity on $M^{10}\times S^1$ is equivalent to D = 10 Type IIA supergravity on $M^{10}$.

== Description ==
In Hořava–Witten theory, D = 11 supergravity or more generally M theory is compactified over the unit interval $I$, expressed as orbifold $I=S^1//\mathbb{Z}_2$. For that, $\mathbb{Z}_2$ does not act free on $S^1\subset\mathbb{C}$ by complex conjugation with fixed points $\pm 1\in S^1$. Alternatively, using the representation $S^1 \cong\mathbb{R}/\mathbb{Z}$, one can use the involution $-\colon\mathbb{R}\rightarrow\mathbb{R}$ given by sign swap. (This is different from the more Common free antipodal action of $\mathbb{Z}_2$ on $S^1\subset\mathbb{C}$ with $S^1=\mathbb{R}P^1=S^1/\mathbb{Z}_2$.) Metrics, diffeomorphisms und gravitino modes on $\mathbb{R}^{10}\times S^1//\mathbb{Z}_2$ are then those on $\mathbb{R}^{10}\times S^1$ invariant under the action of $\mathbb{Z}_2$.

Using the two fixed points of the action, hence both endpoints of the unit interval, two ten-dimensional theories can be connected using an eleven-dimensional theory. Hořava–Witten theory in particular studies the consequence of this correspondence on the anomalies of these theories, in particular of a cancellation is possible. On an eleven-dimensional smooth manifold, there are no gravitational anomalies, but there are in orbifolds. Furthermore, its fixed points lead to additional massless modes.

Dualities of string theory with blue S-duality und red T-duality.

Hořava–Witten theory in particular studies M theory on the orbifold $\mathbb{R}^9\times S^1\times S^1//\mathbb{Z}_2$ with two separate compactifications, one over the circle and one over the unit interval: In the former case, M theory is equivalent to Type IIA theory on $\mathbb{R}^9\times S^1//\mathbb{Z}_2$, which is T-dual to Type I supergravity on $\mathbb{R}^9\times S^1$. In the latter case, M theory is equivalent to heterotic $E_8\times E_8$ string theory on $\mathbb{R}^9\times S^1$. A connection fails due to the different gauge groups $\operatorname{SO}(16)\times\operatorname{SO}(16)$ of Type I string theory and $E_8\times E_8$ of the eponymous heterotic $E_8\times E_8$ string theory. Both can however be connected to heterotic $\operatorname{SO}(32)$ string theory. Typ I supergravity is S-dual to heterotic $\operatorname{SO}(32)$ string theory and under symmetry breaking reduces to heterotic $\operatorname{SO}(16)\times\operatorname{SO}(16)$ string theory, which also holds for heterotic $E_8\times E_8$ string theory.

Hořava-Witten theory more generally studies M theory in the orbifold $M^{11}//\mathbb{Z}_2$ with an eleven-dimensional smooth manifold $M^{11}$ with an action of $\mathbb{Z}_2$ with a ten-dimensional fixed points space. (Exactly this is the case for $\mathbb{R}^{10}\times S^1//\mathbb{Z}_2$ with the fixed points space $\mathbb{R}^{10}\times\{\pm 1\}$.)

== Literature ==
- Hořava, Petr; Witten, Edward (1995). "Heterotic and Type I string dynamics from eleven dimensions". Nucl. Phys. B. 460. arXiv:hep-th/9510209. doi:10.1016/0550-3213(95)00621-4.
- Witten, Edward (1996). "Strong Coupling Expansion Of Calabi-Yau Compactification". Nucl. Phys. B. 471. arXiv:hep-th/9602070. doi:10.1016/0550-3213(96)00190-3.
- Hořava, Petr; Witten, Edward (1996). "Eleven dimensional supergravity on a manifold with boundary". Nucl. Phys. B. 475. arXiv:hep-th/9603142. doi:10.1016/0550-3213(96)00308-2.
