= Hanany–Witten transition =

Theoretical process

In theoretical physics the Hanany–Witten transition, also called the Hanany–Witten effect, refers to any process in a superstring theory in which two p-branes cross resulting in the creation or destruction of a third p-brane. A special case of this process was first discovered by Amihay Hanany and Edward Witten in 1996. All other known cases of Hanany–Witten transitions are related to the original case via combinations of S-dualities and T-dualities. This effect can be expanded to string theory, 2 strings cross together resulting in the creation or destruction of a third string.

== The original effect ==
The original Hanany–Witten transition was discovered in type IIB superstring theory in flat, 10-dimensional Minkowski space. They considered a configuration of NS5-branes, D5-branes and D3-branes which today is called a Hanany–Witten brane cartoon. They demonstrated that a subsector of the corresponding open string theory is described by a 3-dimensional Yang–Mills gauge theory. However they found that the string theory space of solutions, called the moduli space, only agreed with the known Yang-Mills moduli space if whenever an NS5-brane and a D5-brane cross, a D3-brane stretched between them is created or destroyed.

They also presented various other arguments in support of their effect, such as a derivation from the worldvolume Wess–Zumino terms. This proof uses the fact that the flux from each brane renders the action of the other brane ill-defined if one does not include the D3-brane.

=== The S-rule ===
Furthermore, they discovered the S-rule, which states that in a supersymmetric configuration the number of D3-branes stretched between a D5-brane and an NS5-brane may only be equal to 0 or 1. Then the Hanany-Witten effect implies that after the D5-brane and the NS5-brane cross, if there was a single D3-brane stretched between them it will be destroyed, and if there was not one then one will be created. In other words, there cannot be more than one D3 brane that stretches between a D5 brane and an NS5 brane.

== Generalizations ==
=== (p,q) 5-branes ===
More generally, NS5-branes and D5-branes may form bound states known as (p,q) 5-branes. The above argument was extended in Branes and Supersymmetry Breaking in Three Dimensional Gauge Theories to the case of a (p,q) and a (p',q') 5-brane which cross. The authors found that the number of D3-branes created or destroyed must be equal to pq'-p'q. Furthmore they showed that this leads to a generalized S-rule, which states that in a supersymmetric configuration the number of D3-branes never goes negative upon crossing two 5-branes. If it does go negative, then the gauge theory exhibits spontaneous supersymmetry breaking.

=== Dual forms of the effect ===
Via a series of T-dualities one obtains the result that in any type II superstring theory, when an NS5-brane and a Dp-brane cross one necessarily creates or destroys a D(p-2)-brane. Lifting this statement to M-theory one finds that when two M5-branes cross, one creates or destroys an M2-brane. Using S-duality one may obtain transitions without NS5-brane. For example, when a D5-brane and a D3-cross one creates or destroys a fundamental string.
