= Domain wall (string theory) =

Theoretical (d–1)-dimensional singularity

In string theory, a domain wall is a theoretical (d−1)-dimensional singularity. A domain wall is meant to represent an object of codimension one embedded into space (a defect in space localized in one spatial dimension). For example, D8-branes are domain walls in type II string theory. In M-theory, the existence of Horava–Witten domain walls, "ends of the world" that carry an E8 gauge theory, is important for various relations between superstring theory and M-theory.

If domain walls exist, their interactions are hypothesized to emit gravitational waves that would be detectable by LIGO and similar experiments.

== See also ==
- Topological defect
- Cosmic string
- Membrane (M-theory)
- Gravitational singularity
