= Hořava–Lifshitz gravity =

Theory of quantum gravity

Hořava–Lifshitz gravity (or Hořava gravity) is a theory of quantum gravity proposed by Petr Hořava in 2009. It solves the problem of different concepts of time in quantum field theory and general relativity by treating the quantum concept as the more fundamental so that space and time are not equivalent (anisotropic) at high energy level. The relativistic concept of time with its Lorentz invariance emerges at large distances. The theory relies on the theory of foliations to produce its causal structure. It is related to topologically massive gravity and the Cotton tensor. It is a possible UV completion of general relativity. Also, the speed of light goes to infinity at high energies. The novelty of this approach, compared to previous approaches to quantum gravity such as loop quantum gravity, is that it uses concepts from condensed matter physics such as quantum critical phenomena. Hořava's initial formulation was found to have side-effects such as predicting very different results for a spherical Sun compared to a slightly non-spherical Sun, so others have modified the theory. Inconsistencies remain, though progress was made on the theory. Nevertheless, observations of gravitational waves emitted by the neutron-star merger GW170817 contravene predictions made by this model of gravity. Some have revised the theory to account for this.

== Detailed balance condition ==
Hořava originally imposed the theory to satisfy the detailed balance condition which considerably reduces the number of coupling constants in the action.

== See also ==
- Superfluid vacuum theory
- Causal dynamical triangulation
- Problem of time
