= Parallel Universes (film) =

2001 film

- Written by: Malcolm Clark
- Release date: 2001
- Running time: 50 minutes
- Country: United Kingdom

Parallel Universes is a 2001 documentary produced by the BBC's Horizon series. The documentary has to do with parallel universes, string theory, M theory, supergravity, and other theoretical physics concepts. Participants include Michio Kaku, Paul Steinhardt, and other physicists.

The program is about explanation of the Big Bang theory through the M theory and that there are many other parallel universes with different laws of physics.

It has been rated 4 star by BBC, History Channel and 4 1/2 by Discovery Networks.
