= Petr Hořava =

Petr Hořava may refer to:

- Petr Hořava (theorist), Czech string theorist
- Petr Hořava (ice hockey), Czech ice hockey player
