= Ramond–Ramond field =

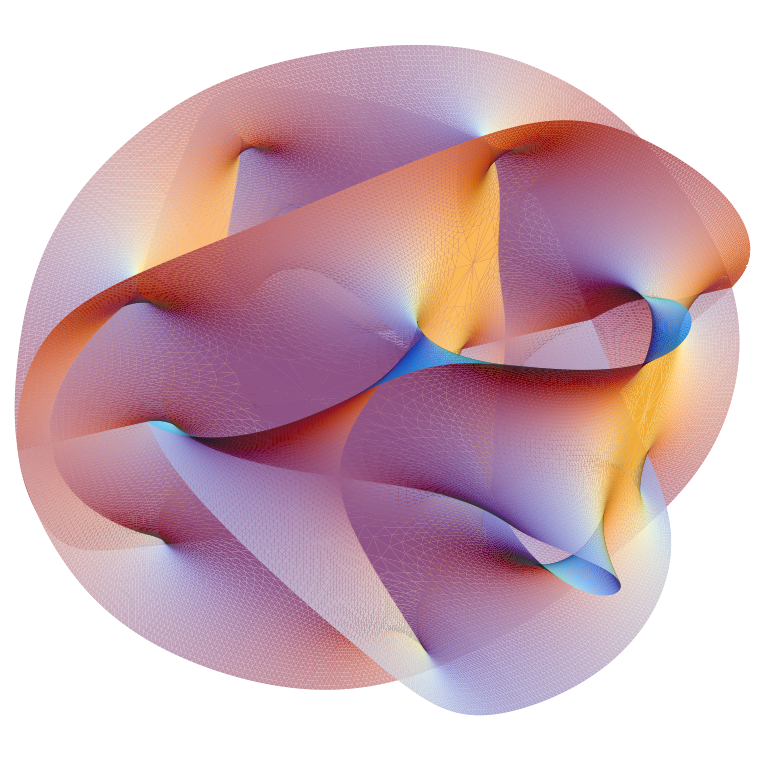

In theoretical physics, Ramond–Ramond fields are differential form fields in the 10-dimensional spacetime of type II supergravity theories, which are the classical limits of type II string theory. The ranks of the fields depend on which type II theory is considered. As Joseph Polchinski argued in 1995, D-branes are the charged objects that act as sources for these fields, according to the rules of p-form electrodynamics. It has been conjectured that quantum RR fields are not differential forms, but instead are classified by twisted K-theory.

The adjective "Ramond–Ramond" reflects the fact that in the RNS formalism, these fields appear in the Ramond–Ramond sector in which all vector fermions are periodic. Both uses of the word "Ramond" refer to Pierre Ramond, who studied such boundary conditions (the so-called Ramond boundary conditions) and the fields that satisfy them in 1971.

== Defining the fields ==
=== The fields in each theory ===
As in Maxwell's theory of electromagnetism and its generalization, p-form electrodynamics, Ramond–Ramond (RR) fields come in pairs consisting of a p-form potential C_{p} and a (p + 1)-form field strength G_{p+1}. The field strength is, as usual defined to be the exterior derivative of the potential G_{p+1} = dC_{p}.

As is usual in such theories, if one allows topologically nontrivial configurations or charged matter (D-branes) then the connections are only defined on each coordinate patch of spacetime, and the values on various patches are glued using transition functions. Unlike the case of electromagnetism, in the presence of a nontrivial Neveu–Schwarz 3-form field strength the field strength defined above is no longer gauge invariant and so also needs to be defined patchwise with the Dirac string off of a given patch interpreted itself as a D-brane. This extra complication is responsible for some of the more interesting phenomena in string theory, such as the Hanany–Witten transition.

The choices of allowed values of p depend on the theory. In type IIA supergravity, fields exist for p = 1 and p = 3. In type IIB supergravity, on the other hand, there are fields for p = 0, p = 2 and p = 4, although the p = 4 field is constrained to satisfy the self-duality condition G_{5} = *G_{5} where * is the Hodge star. The self-duality condition cannot be imposed by a Lagrangian without either introducing extra fields or ruining the manifest super-Poincaré invariance of the theory, thus type IIB supergravity is considered to be a non-Lagrangian theory. A third theory, called massive or Romans IIA supergravity, includes a field strength G_{0}, called the Romans mass. Being a zero-form, it has no corresponding connection. Furthermore, the equations of motion impose that the Romans mass is constant. In the quantum theory Joseph Polchinski has shown that G_{0} is an integer, which jumps by one as one crosses a D8-brane.

=== The democratic formulation ===
It is often convenient to use the democratic formulation of type II string theories, which was introduced by Paul Townsend in p-Brane Democracy. In D-brane Wess-Zumino Actions, T-duality and the Cosmological Constant Michael Green, Chris Hull and Paul Townsend constructed the field strengths and found the gauge transformations that leave them invariant. Finally in New Formulations of D=10 Supersymmetry and D8-O8 Domain Walls the authors completed the formulation, providing a Lagrangian and explaining the role of the fermions. In this formulation one includes all of the even field strengths in IIA and all of the odd field strengths in IIB. The additional field strengths are defined by the star condition G_{p}=*G_{10−p}. As a consistency check, notice that the star condition is compatible with the self-duality of G_{5}, thus the democratic formulation contains the same number of degrees of freedom as the original formulation. Similarly to attempts to simultaneously include both electric and magnetic potentials in electromagnetism, the dual gauge potentials may not be added to the democratically formulated Lagrangian in a way that maintains the manifest locality of the theory. This is because the dual potentials are obtained from the original potentials by integrating the star condition.

== Ramond–Ramond gauge transformations ==
The type II supergravity Langragians are invariant under a number of local symmetries, such as diffeomorphisms and local supersymmetry transformations. In addition the various form-fields transform under Neveu–Schwarz and Ramond–Ramond gauge transformations.

In the democratic formulation the Ramond–Ramond gauge transformations of the gauge potentials that leave the action invariant are

$$C_p\rightarrow C_p+d\Lambda_{p-1}+H\wedge\Lambda_{p-3}$$

where H is the Neveu-Schwarz 3-form field strength and the gauge parameters $\Lambda_q$ are q-forms. As the gauge transformations mix various $\Lambda_q$'s, it is necessary that each RR form be transformed simultaneously, using the same set of gauge parameters. The H-dependent terms, which have no analogue in electro-magnetism, are required to preserve the contribution to the action of the Chern–Simons terms that are present in type II supergravity theories.

Notice that there are multiple gauge parameters corresponding to the same gauge transformation, in particular we may add any (d + H)-closed form to Lambda. Thus in the quantum theory we must also gauge the gauge transformations, and then gauge those, on so on until the dimensions are sufficiently low. In the Fadeev–Popov quantization this corresponds to adding a tower of ghosts. Mathematically, in the case in which H vanishes, the resulting structure is the Deligne cohomology of the spacetime. For nontrivial H, after including the Dirac quantization condition, it has been conjectured to correspond instead to differential K-theory.

Notice that, thanks to the H terms in the gauge transformations, the field strengths also transform nontrivially

$$G_{p+1}\rightarrow G_{p+1}+H\wedge d\Lambda_{p-3} .$$

=== The improved field strengths ===
One often introduces improved field strengths

$$F_{p+1}=G_{p+1}+H\wedge C_{p-2}$$

that are gauge-invariant.

Although they are gauge-invariant, the improved field strengths are neither closed nor quantized, instead they are only twisted-closed. This means that they satisfy the equation of motion $dF_{p+1}=H\wedge F_{p-1}$, which is just the Bianchi identity $0=d^2C_p$. They are also "twisted-quantized" in the sense that one can transform back to the original field strength whose integrals over compact cycles are quantized. It is the original field strengths that are sourced by D-brane charge, in the sense that the integral of the original p-form field strength G_{p} over any contractible p-cycle is equal to the D(8-p)-brane charge linked by that cycle. Since D-brane charge is quantized, G_{p}, and not the improved field strength, is quantized.

== Field equations ==
=== Equations and Bianchi identities ===
As usual in p-form gauge theories, the form fields must obey the classical field equations and Bianchi identities. The former express the condition that variations of the action with respect to the various fields must be trivial. We will now restrict our attention to those field equations that come from the variation of the Ramond–Ramond (RR) fields, but in practice these need to be supplemented with the field equations coming from the variations of the Neveu–Schwarz B-field, the graviton, the dilaton and their superpartners the gravitinos and the dilatino.

In the democratic formulation, the Bianchi identity for the field strength G_{p+1} is the classical field equation for its Hodge dual G_{9−p}, and so it will suffice to impose the Bianchi identities for each RR field. These are just the conditions that the RR potentials C_{p} are locally defined, and that therefore the exterior derivative acting on them is nilpotent

$$0=d^2C_p=dG_{p+1}=dF_{p+1}+H\wedge G_{p-1}.$$

=== D-branes are sources for RR fields ===
In many applications one wishes to add sources for the RR fields. These sources are called D-branes. As in classical electromagnetism one may add sources by including a coupling C_{p}$\mathcal J_{10-p}$ of the p-form potential to a (10-p)-form current $\mathcal J_{10-p}$ in the Lagrangian density. The usual convention in the string theory literature appears to be to not write this term explicitly in the action.

The current $\mathcal J_{10-p}$ modifies the equation of motion that comes from the variation of C_{p}. As is the case with magnetic monopoles in electromagnetism, this source also invaliditates the dual Bianchi identity as it is a point at which the dual field is not defined. In the modified equation of motion $\mathcal J_{p+2}$ appears on the left hand side of the equation of motion instead of zero. For future simplicity, we will also interchange p and 7 − p, then the equation of motion in the presence of a source is

$$\mathcal J_{9-p}=d^2C_{7-p}=dG_{8-p}=dF_{8-p}+H\wedge G_{6-p}.$$

The (9-p)-form $\mathcal J_{9-p}$ is the Dp-brane current, which means that it is Poincaré dual to the worldvolume of a (p + 1)-dimensional extended object called a Dp-brane. The discrepancy of one in the naming scheme is historical and comes from the fact that one of the p + 1 directions spanned by the Dp-brane is often timelike, leaving p spatial directions.

The above Bianchi identity is interpreted to mean that the Dp-brane is, in analogy with magnetic monopoles in electromagnetism, magnetically charged under the RR p-form C_{7−p}. If instead one considers this Bianchi identity to be a field equation for C_{p+1}, then one says that the Dp-brane is electrically charged under the (p + 1)-form C_{p+1}.

The above equation of motion implies that there are two ways to derive the Dp-brane charge from the ambient fluxes. First, one may integrate dG_{8−p} over a surface, which will give the Dp-brane charge intersected by that surface. The second method is related to the first by Stokes' theorem. One may integrate G_{8−p} over a cycle, this will yield the Dp-brane charge linked by that cycle. The quantization of Dp-brane charge in the quantum theory then implies the quantization of the field strengths G, but not of the improved field strengths F.

=== Twisted K-theory interpretation ===
It has been conjectured that RR fields, as well as D-branes, are classified by twisted K-theory. In this framework, the above equations of motion have natural interpretations. The source free equations of motion for the improved field strengths F imply that the formal sum of all of the F_{p}'s is an element of the H-twisted de Rham cohomology. This is a version of De Rham cohomology in which the differential is not the exterior derivative d, but instead (d+H) where H is the Neveu-Schwarz 3-form. Notice that (d+H), as is necessary for the cohomology to be well-defined, squares to zero.

The improved field strengths F live in the classical theory, where the transition from quantum to classical is interpreted as tensoring by the rationals. So the F's must be some rational version of twisted K-theory. Such a rational version, in fact a characteristic class of twisted K-theory, is already known. It is the twisted Chern class defined in Twisted K-theory and the K-theory of Bundle Gerbes by Peter Bouwknegt, Alan L. Carey, Varghese Mathai, Michael K. Murray and Danny Stevenson and extended in Chern character in twisted K-Theory: Equivariant and holomorphic cases. The authors have shown that twisted Chern characters are always elements of the H-twisted de Rham cohomology.

Unlike the improved field strengths, the original field strengths G's are untwisted, integral cohomology classes. In addition the G's are not gauge-invariant, which means that they are not uniquely defined but instead may only be defined as equivalence classes. These correspond to the cohomology classes in the Atiyah Hirzebruch Spectral Sequence construction of twisted K-theory, which are only defined up to terms which are closed under any of a series of differential operators.

The source terms appear to be obstructions to the existence of a K-theory class. The other equations of motion, such as those obtained by varying the NS B-field, do not have K-theory interpretations. The incorporation of these corrections in the K-theory framework is an open problem. For more on this problem, click here.

== See also ==
- Kalb–Ramond field
