= Superconformal algebra =

Algebra combining both supersymmetry and conformal symmetry

In theoretical physics, the superconformal algebra is a graded Lie algebra or superalgebra that combines the conformal algebra and supersymmetry. In two dimensions, the superconformal algebra is infinite-dimensional. In higher dimensions, superconformal algebras are finite-dimensional and generate the superconformal group (in two Euclidean dimensions, the Lie superalgebra does not generate any Lie supergroup).

== Superconformal algebra in dimension greater than 2 ==
The conformal group of the $(p+q)$-dimensional space $\mathbb{R}^{p,q}$ is $SO(p+1,q+1)$ and its Lie algebra is $\mathfrak{so}(p+1,q+1)$. The superconformal algebra is a Lie superalgebra containing the bosonic factor $\mathfrak{so}(p+1,q+1)$ and whose odd generators transform in spinor representations of $\mathfrak{so}(p+1,q+1)$. Given Kac's classification of finite-dimensional simple Lie superalgebras, this can only happen for small values of $p$ and $q$. A (possibly incomplete) list is

- $\mathfrak{osp}^*(2N|2,2)$ in 3+0D thanks to $\mathfrak{usp}(2,2)\simeq\mathfrak{so}(4,1)$;
- $\mathfrak{osp}(N|4)$ in 2+1D thanks to $\mathfrak{sp}(4,\mathbb{R})\simeq\mathfrak{so}(3,2)$;
- $\mathfrak{su}^*(2N|4)$ in 4+0D thanks to $\mathfrak{su}^*(4)\simeq\mathfrak{so}(5,1)$;
- $\mathfrak{su}(2,2|N)$ in 3+1D thanks to $\mathfrak{su}(2,2)\simeq\mathfrak{so}(4,2)$;
- $\mathfrak{sl}(4|N)$ in 2+2D thanks to $\mathfrak{sl}(4,\mathbb{R})\simeq\mathfrak{so}(3,3)$;
- real forms of $F(4)$ in five dimensions
- $\mathfrak{osp}(8^*|2N)$ in 5+1D, thanks to the fact that spinor and fundamental representations of $\mathfrak{so}(8,\mathbb{C})$ are mapped to each other by outer automorphisms.

== Superconformal algebra in 3+1D ==
According to the superconformal algebra with $\mathcal{N}$ supersymmetries in 3+1 dimensions is given by the bosonic generators $P_\mu$, $D$, $M_{\mu\nu}$, $K_\mu$, the U(1) R-symmetry $A$, the SU(N) R-symmetry $T^i_j$ and the fermionic generators $Q^{\alpha i}$, $\overline{Q}^{\dot\alpha}_i$, $S^\alpha_i$ and ${\overline{S}}^{\dot\alpha i}$. Here, $\mu,\nu,\rho,\dots$ denote spacetime indices; $\alpha,\beta,\dots$ left-handed Weyl spinor indices; $\dot\alpha,\dot\beta,\dots$ right-handed Weyl spinor indices; and $i,j,\dots$ the internal R-symmetry indices.

The Lie superbrackets of the bosonic conformal algebra are given by

$$[M_{\mu\nu},M_{\rho\sigma}]=\eta_{\nu\rho}M_{\mu\sigma}-\eta_{\mu\rho}M_{\nu\sigma}+\eta_{\nu\sigma}M_{\rho\mu}-\eta_{\mu\sigma}M_{\rho\nu}$$
$$[M_{\mu\nu},P_\rho]=\eta_{\nu\rho}P_\mu-\eta_{\mu\rho}P_\nu$$
$$[M_{\mu\nu},K_\rho]=\eta_{\nu\rho}K_\mu-\eta_{\mu\rho}K_\nu$$
$$[M_{\mu\nu},D]=0$$
$$[D,P_\rho]=-P_\rho$$
$$[D,K_\rho]=+K_\rho$$
$$[P_\mu,K_\nu]=-2M_{\mu\nu}+2\eta_{\mu\nu}D$$
$$[K_n,K_m]=0$$
$$[P_n,P_m]=0$$

where η is the Minkowski metric; while the ones for the fermionic generators are:

$$\left\{ Q_{\alpha i}, \overline{Q}_{\dot{\beta}}^j \right\} = 2 \delta^j_i \sigma^{\mu}_{\alpha \dot{\beta}}P_\mu$$
$$\left\{ Q, Q \right\} = \left\{ \overline{Q}, \overline{Q} \right\} = 0$$
$$\left\{ S_{\alpha}^i, \overline{S}_{\dot{\beta}j} \right\} = 2 \delta^i_j \sigma^{\mu}_{\alpha \dot{\beta}}K_\mu$$
$$\left\{ S, S \right\} = \left\{ \overline{S}, \overline{S} \right\} = 0$$
$$\left\{ Q, S \right\} =$$
$$\left\{ Q, \overline{S} \right\} = \left\{ \overline{Q}, S \right\} = 0$$

The bosonic conformal generators do not carry any R-charges, as they commute with the R-symmetry generators:

$$[A,M]=[A,D]=[A,P]=[A,K]=0$$
$$[T,M]=[T,D]=[T,P]=[T,K]=0$$

But the fermionic generators do carry R-charge:

$$[A,Q]=-\frac{1}{2}Q$$
$$[A,\overline{Q}]=\frac{1}{2}\overline{Q}$$
$$[A,S]=\frac{1}{2}S$$
$$[A,\overline{S}]=-\frac{1}{2}\overline{S}$$

$$[T^i_j,Q_k]= - \delta^i_k Q_j$$
$$[T^i_j,{\overline{Q}}^k]= \delta^k_j {\overline{Q}}^i$$
$$[T^i_j,S^k]=\delta^k_j S^i$$
$$[T^i_j,\overline{S}_k]= - \delta^i_k \overline{S}_j$$

Under bosonic conformal transformations, the fermionic generators transform as:

$$[D,Q]=-\frac{1}{2}Q$$
$$[D,\overline{Q}]=-\frac{1}{2}\overline{Q}$$
$$[D,S]=\frac{1}{2}S$$
$$[D,\overline{S}]=\frac{1}{2}\overline{S}$$
$$[P,Q]=[P,\overline{Q}]=0$$
$$[K,S]=[K,\overline{S}]=0$$

== Superconformal algebra in 2D ==
There are two possible algebras with minimal supersymmetry in two dimensions; a Neveu–Schwarz algebra and a Ramond algebra. Additional supersymmetry is possible, for instance the N = 2 superconformal algebra.

== See also ==
- Conformal symmetry
- Super Virasoro algebra
- Supersymmetry algebra
