= Pierre Ramond =

American physicist

- Born: 31 January 1943 (age 83); Neuilly-sur-Seine, Hauts-de-Seine, France
- Education: New Jersey Institute of Technology; Syracuse University
- Known for: RNS formalism Ramond–Ramond field Kalb–Ramond field Ramond algebra Seesaw mechanism
- Scientific career
- Fields: Theoretical physics
- Workplaces: University of Florida
- Doctoral advisor: A. P. Balachandran

Pierre Ramond (/rəˈmɔːnd/; born 31 January 1943) is distinguished professor emeritus of physics at University of Florida in Gainesville, Florida. He initiated the development of superstring theory.

== Academic career ==
Ramond completed his BSEE from Newark College of Engineering (now New Jersey Institute of Technology) in 1965 and completed his Ph.D. in physics from Syracuse University in 1969. He was a postdoctoral fellow at NAL (FermiLab) from 1969 to 1971. He became instructor at Yale University from 1971 to 1973 and assistant professor at Yale University from 1973 to 1976. He moved to Caltech as an R. A. Millikan Senior Fellow in 1976. He became a professor of physics at University of Florida in 1980, and given the title of "distinguished professor" in 1999.

== Superstring theory ==
Ramond initiated the development of superstring theory. In 1970, Ramond generalized Dirac's work for point-like particles to stringlike ones. In this process he discovered two-dimensional supersymmetry and laid the ground for supersymmetry in four spacetime dimensions. He found the spectrum of fermionic modes in string theory and the paper started superstring theory. From this paper André Neveu and John Schwarz developed a string theory with both fermions and bosons.

According to quantum mechanics, particles can be divided into two types: bosons and fermions. The distinction between bosons and fermions is basic. Fermions are particles which have half integer spin (1/2, 3/2, 5/2 and so on, multiplied by the reduced Planck constant), and bosons are particles which have integer spin (0, 1, 2 and so on, multiplied by the reduced Planck constant). Examples of fermions are quarks, leptons and baryons. Quantum of fundamental forces such as gravitons, photons, etc. are all bosons. In quantum field theory, fermions interact by exchanging bosons.

Early string theory proposed by Yoichiro Nambu and others in 1970 was only a bosonic string. Ramond completed the theory by inventing a fermionic string to accompany the bosonic ones. The Virasoro algebra which is the symmetry algebra of the bosonic string was generalized to a superconformal algebra (the Ramond algebra, an example of a super Virasoro algebra) including anticommuting operators also.

In 1979, with Murray Gell-Mann and Richard Slansky he proposed the seesaw mechanism which explains small neutrino masses in the context of Grand-Unified theories.

== Honors and awards ==
Ramond has received several awards for his contributions to theoretical physics. He received a Distinguished Alumnus Award from NJIT in 1990. Fellow of the American Physical Society, 1998 Fellow of the American Academy of Arts and Sciences. Recipient of the 1992 Boris Pregel award from the NY Academy of Sciences; 2004 Oskar Klein Medal awarded by the Swedish Royal Academy of Sciences & Stockholm University; 2007 Lise Meitner Prize from Chalmers Technical University & Goteborg University. In 2015 he received the prestigious Dannie Heineman Prize for Mathematical Physics. In 2020, with André Neveu and Miguel Virasoro, he was jointly awarded the Dirac Medal of the ICTP for their pioneering contributions to the inception and formulation of string theory. He retired in 2023 to become distinguished professor emeritus.

In addition, Ramond has played an active role in service to his profession as a scientist and educator. He was President of the Aspen Center For Physics in 2006-2008; he served as chair of the Faculty Senate of the University of Florida in 2004-05, and chair of the Division of Particles and Fields of the American Physical Society in 2012.

== Publications ==
=== Articles ===
- Ramond, Pierre (1971). "Dual theory for free fermions". Physical Review D. 3 (10): 2415–2418. Bibcode:1971PhRvD...3.2415R. doi:10.1103/PhysRevD.3.2415.
- Kalb, Michael; —— (1974). "Classical direct interstring action". Physical Review D. 9 (8): 2273–2284. Bibcode:1974PhRvD...9.2273K. doi:10.1103/PhysRevD.9.2273.
- Gross, Benedict; Kostant, Bertram; ——; Sternberg, Shlomo (21 July 1998). "The Weyl character formula, the half-spin representations, and equal rank subgroups". Proc Natl Acad Sci U S A. 95 (15): 8441–8442. arXiv:math/9808133. Bibcode:1998PNAS...95.8441G. doi:10.1073/pnas.95.15.8441. PMC 21094. PMID 9671696.
- —— (2012). "Dual model with fermions: memoirs of an early string theorist". In Cappelli, Andrea; Castellani, Elena; Colomo, Filippo; Di Vecchia, Paolo (eds.). The Birth of String Theory. Cambridge University Press. pp. 361–372. arXiv:0708.3656. Bibcode:2007arXiv0708.3656R. ISBN 978-0-521-19790-8.

=== Books ===
- Field Theory : A Modern Primer (2nd ed.). Westview Press. 1981–1990. ISBN 0-201-30450-3.
- Journeys Beyond the Standard Model. Westview Press. 2003. ISBN 0-8133-4131-0.
- Group Theory: A Physicist's Survey. Cambridge University Press Press. 2010. ISBN 9780521896030.
