= Burt Ovrut =

American theoretical physicist

- Education: University of Chicago (Ph.D.)
- Known for: String theory M-theory; Heterotic string theory
- Scientific career
- Fields: Theoretical physics Superstring Theory
- Workplaces: University of Pennsylvania
- Doctoral advisors: Benjamin W. Lee; Yoichiro Nambu
- Website: https://www.physics.upenn.edu/people/standing-faculty/burt-ovrut

Burt Ovrut is an American theoretical physicist best known for his work on heterotic string theory. He is currently Professor of Theoretical High Energy Physics at the University of Pennsylvania.

Ovrut earned his Ph.D. in physics at the University of Chicago in 1978. His doctoral advisors were Benjamin W. Lee and Yoichiro Nambu, and his thesis was on an Sp(4) x U(1) Theory of the Weak and Electromagnetic Interactions.

Ovrut is one of those who pioneered the use of M-theory to explain the Big Bang without the presence of a singularity. Together with Justin Khoury, Paul Steinhardt and Neil Turok, he introduced the notion of the Ekpyrotic Universe, "... a cosmological model in which the hot big bang universe is produced by the collision of a brane in the bulk space with a bounding orbifold plane, beginning from an otherwise cold, vacuous, static universe".

Recently Burt Ovrut and his collaborators constructed a Calabi-Yau compactification that reproduces the Minimal Supersymmetric Standard Model without any exotics.

Ovrut was elected as a Fellow of the American Physical Society in 2000.
