= Peter Bouwknegt =

Dutch mathematician (born 1961)

Pier Gerard "Peter" Bouwknegt (born 20 April 1961, Geldrop) is professor of theoretical physics and mathematics at the Australian National University (ANU), and deputy director of their Mathematical Sciences Institute. He is an adjunct professor at University of Adelaide.

== Biography ==
He studied Theoretical Physics and Mathematics at the University of Utrecht, Netherlands, and at the University of Amsterdam under the direction of Prof F.A. Bais, obtaining his PhD in 1988. After that, he became a postdoctoral fellow at MIT, CERN, and the University of Southern California. He moved to Australia in 1995 and worked at the University of Adelaide as an ARC QEII Fellow and subsequently as an ARC Senior Research Fellow. In 2005, he was appointed Professor of Theoretical Physics and Mathematics at the Australian National University.

== Awards ==
In 2001, he received the 2001 Australian Mathematical Society Medal, and from 2009 to 2011, he served on the Australian Research Council's College of Experts. He was formerly director of the Mathematical Sciences Institute at ANU, where is now deputy director.

== Academic work ==
Bowknegt specializes in the mathematical foundations of String Theory and Conformal Field Theory. According to his web site at ANU, his specific interests are "the investigation of mathematical aspects of physical theories, in particular quantum field theories. Main expertise is the structure of two-dimensional conformal field theory and their applications in diverse areas such as condensed matter physics, integrable models of statistical mechanics and string theory, as well as the mathematical structures underlying string theory and D-branes, using mathematical techniques such as K-theory and gerbes."

== Sources ==
- P.G. Bouwknegt, 1961 - at the University of Amsterdam Album Academicum website
