= N = 2 superconformal algebra =

2D supersymmetric generalization to the conformal algebra

In mathematical physics, the 2D N = 2 superconformal algebra is an infinite-dimensional Lie superalgebra, related to supersymmetry, that occurs in string theory and two-dimensional conformal field theory. It has important applications in mirror symmetry. It was introduced by M. Ademollo, L. Brink, and A. D'Adda et al. (1976) as a gauge algebra of the U(1) fermionic string.

== Definition ==
There are two slightly different ways to describe the N = 2 superconformal algebra, called the N = 2 Ramond algebra and the N = 2 Neveu–Schwarz algebra, which are isomorphic (see below) but differ in the choice of standard basis. The N = 2 superconformal algebra is the Lie superalgebra with basis of even elements c, L_{n}, J_{n}, for n an integer, and odd elements G^{+}_{r}, G^{−}_{r}, where $r\in {\mathbb Z}$ (for the Ramond basis) or $r\in {1\over 2}+{\mathbb Z}$ (for the Neveu–Schwarz basis) defined by the following relations:

c is in the center
$$[L_m,L_n] = \left(m-n\right) L_{m+n} + {c\over 12} \left(m^3-m\right) \delta_{m+n,0}$$
$$[L_m,\,J_n]=-nJ_{m+n}$$
$$[J_m,J_n] = {c\over 3} m\delta_{m+n,0}$$
$$\{G_r^+,G_s^-\} = L_{r+s} + {1\over 2} \left(r-s\right) J_{r+s} + {c\over 6} \left(r^2-{1\over 4}\right) \delta_{r+s,0}$$
$$\{G_r^+,G_s^+\} = 0 = \{G_r^-,G_s^-\}$$
$$[L_m,G_r^{\pm}] = \left( {m\over 2}-r \right) G^\pm_{r+m}$$
$$[J_m,G_r^\pm]= \pm G_{m+r}^\pm$$

If $r,s\in {\mathbb Z}$ in these relations, this yields the N = 2 Ramond algebra; while if $r,s\in {1\over 2}+{\mathbb Z}$ are half-integers, it gives the N = 2 Neveu–Schwarz algebra. The operators $L_n$ generate a Lie subalgebra isomorphic to the Virasoro algebra. Together with the operators $G_r=G_r^+ + G_r^-$, they generate a Lie superalgebra isomorphic to the super Virasoro algebra, giving the Ramond algebra if $r,s$ are integers and the Neveu–Schwarz algebra otherwise. When represented as operators on a complex inner product space, $c$ is taken to act as multiplication by a real scalar, denoted by the same letter and called the central charge, and the adjoint structure is as follows:

$${L_n^*=L_{-n}, \,\, J_m^*=J_{-m}, \,\,(G_r^\pm)^*=G_{-r}^\mp, \,\,c^*=c}$$

== Properties ==
- The N = 2 Ramond and Neveu–Schwarz algebras are isomorphic by the spectral shift isomorphism $\alpha$ of Schwimmer & Seiberg (1987): $\alpha(L_n)=L_n +{1\over 2} J_n + {c\over 24}\delta_{n,0}$ $\alpha(J_n)=J_n +{c\over 6}\delta_{n,0}$ $\alpha(G_r^\pm)=G_{r\pm {1\over 2}}^\pm$ with inverse: $\alpha^{-1}(L_n)=L_n -{1\over 2} J_n + {c\over 24}\delta_{n,0}$ $\alpha^{-1}(J_n)=J_n -{c\over 6}\delta_{n,0}$ $\alpha^{-1}(G_r^\pm)=G_{r\mp {1\over 2}}^\pm$
- In the N = 2 Ramond algebra, the zero mode operators $L_0$, $J_0$, $G_0^\pm$ and the constants form a five-dimensional Lie superalgebra. They satisfy the same relations as the fundamental operators in Kähler geometry, with $L_0$ corresponding to the Laplacian, $J_0$ the degree operator, and $G_0^\pm$ the $\partial$ and $\overline{\partial}$ operators.
- Even integer powers of the spectral shift give automorphisms of the N = 2 superconformal algebras, called spectral shift automorphisms. Another automorphism $\beta$, of period two, is given by $\beta(L_m) = L_m ,$ $\beta(J_m)=-J_m-{c\over 3} \delta_{m,0},$ $\beta(G_r^\pm)=G_r^\mp$ In terms of Kähler operators, $\beta$ corresponds to conjugating the complex structure. Since $\beta\alpha \beta^{-1}=\alpha^{-1}$, the automorphisms $\alpha^2$ and $\beta$ generate a group of automorphisms of the N = 2 superconformal algebra isomorphic to the infinite dihedral group ${\Z}\rtimes {\Z}_2$.
- Twisted operators ${\mathcal L}_n=L_n+ {1\over 2} (n+1)J_n$ were introduced by Eguchi & Yang (1990) and satisfy: $[{\mathcal L}_m,{\mathcal L}_n] = (m-n) {\mathcal L}_{m+n}$ so that these operators satisfy the Virasoro relation with central charge 0. The constant $c$ still appears in the relations for $J_m$ and the modified relations $[{\mathcal L}_m,J_n] = -nJ_{m+n} + {c \over 6} \left(m^2 + m \right) \delta_{m+n,0}$ $\{G_r^+,G_s^-\} = 2{\mathcal L}_{r+s}-2sJ_{r+s} + {c\over 3} \left(m^2+m\right) \delta_{m+n,0}$

== Constructions ==
=== Free field construction ===
Green, Schwarz, and Witten (1988a, 1988b) give a construction using two commuting real bosonic fields $(a_n)$, $(b_n)$

$${[a_m,a_n]={m\over 2}\delta_{m+n,0},\,\,\,\, [b_m,b_n]={m\over 2}\delta_{m+n,0}},
\,\,\,\, a_n^*=a_{-n},\,\,\,\, b_n^*=b_{-n}$$

and a complex fermionic field $(e_r)$

$$\{e_r,e^*_s\}=\delta_{r,s},\,\,\,\, \{e_r,e_s\}=0.$$

$L_n$ is defined to the sum of the Virasoro operators naturally associated with each of the three systems

$$L_n = \sum_m : a_{-m+n} a_m  : + \sum_m : b_{-m+n} b_m : + \sum_r \left(r+{n\over 2}\right): e^*_{r}e_{n+r} :$$

where normal ordering has been used for bosons and fermions.

The current operator $J_n$ is defined by the standard construction from fermions

$$J_n = \sum_r : e_r^*e_{n+r} :$$

and the two supersymmetric operators $G_r^\pm$ by

$$G^+_r=\sum (a_{-m} + i b_{-m}) \cdot e_{r+m},\,\,\,\, G_r^-=\sum (a_{r+m} - ib_{r+m}) \cdot e^*_{m}$$

This yields an N = 2 Neveu–Schwarz algebra with c = 3.

=== SU(2) supersymmetric coset construction ===
Di Vecchia et al. (1986) gave a coset construction of the N = 2 superconformal algebras, generalizing the coset constructions of Goddard, Kent & Olive (1986) for the discrete series representations of the Virasoro and super Virasoro algebra. Given a representation of the affine Kac–Moody algebra of SU(2) at level $\ell$ with basis $E_n,F_n,H_n$ satisfying

$$[H_m,H_n]=2m\ell\delta_{n+m,0},$$
$$[E_m,F_n]=H_{m+n}+m \ell\delta_{m+n,0},$$
$$[H_m,E_n]=2E_{m+n},$$
$$[H_m,F_n]=-2F_{m+n},$$

the supersymmetric generators are defined by

$$G^+_r = (\ell/2+ 1)^{-1/2} \sum E_{-m} \cdot e_{m+r}, \,\,\, G^-_r = (\ell/2 +1 )^{-1/2} \sum F_{r+m}\cdot e_m^*.$$

This yields the N=2 superconformal algebra with

$$c=3\ell/(\ell+2) .$$

The algebra commutes with the bosonic operators

$$X_n=H_n - 2 \sum_r : e_r^*e_{n+r} :.$$

The space of physical states consists of eigenvectors of $X_0$ simultaneously annihilated by the $X_n$'s for positive $n$ and the supercharge operator

$Q=G_{1/2}^+ + G_{-1/2}^-$ (Neveu–Schwarz)
$Q=G_0^+ +G_0^-.$ (Ramond)

The supercharge operator commutes with the action of the affine Weyl group and the physical states lie in a single orbit of this group, a fact which implies the Weyl-Kac character formula.

=== Kazama–Suzuki supersymmetric coset construction ===
Kazama & Suzuki (1989) generalized the SU(2) coset construction to any pair consisting of a simple compact Lie group $G$ and a closed subgroup $H$ of maximal rank, i.e. containing a maximal torus $T$ of $G$, with the additional condition that the dimension of the centre of $H$ is non-zero. In this case the compact Hermitian symmetric space $G/H$ is a Kähler manifold, for example when $H=T$. The physical states lie in a single orbit of the affine Weyl group, which again implies the Weyl–Kac character formula for the affine Kac–Moody algebra of $G$.

== See also ==
- Virasoro algebra
- Super Virasoro algebra
- Coset construction
- Type IIB string theory
