= String phenomenology =

Branch of string theory

String phenomenology is a branch of theoretical physics that uses tools from mathematics and computer science to study the implications of string theory for particle physics and cosmology. In cosmology, string phenomenology studies, among others, implications of string theory for inflation, dark matter and dark energy. In particle physics, efforts include finding realistic or semi-realistic models of particle physics within the string theory landscape. The term "realistic" is usually taken to mean that the low energy limit of string theory yields a model which bears a resemblance to the Minimal Supersymmetric Standard Model (MSSM) or the Standard Model (SM). The latter is obtained after supersymmetry breaking or by starting from a string theory without (target space) supersymmetry. A complementary approach to studying the landscape of string theory solutions is to look at the swampland, which consists of low-energy theories that are not compatible with string theory or sometimes even any quantum theory of gravity.

== See also ==
- String cosmology
- String theory landscape
- Swampland
