= P-form electrodynamics =

Generalization of electrodynamics

In theoretical physics, p-form electrodynamics is a generalization of Maxwell's theory of electromagnetism.

== Ordinary (via. one-form) Abelian electrodynamics ==
We have a 1-form $\mathbf{A}$, a gauge symmetry

$$\mathbf{A} \rightarrow \mathbf{A} + d\alpha ,$$

where $\alpha$ is any arbitrary fixed 0-form and $d$ is the exterior derivative, and a gauge-invariant vector current $\mathbf{J}$ with density 1 satisfying the continuity equation

$$d{\star}\mathbf{J} = 0 ,$$

where ${\star}$ is the Hodge star operator.

Alternatively, we may express $\mathbf{J}$ as a closed (n − 1)-form, but we do not consider that case here.

$\mathbf{F}$ is a gauge-invariant 2-form defined as the exterior derivative $\mathbf{F} = d\mathbf{A}$.

$\mathbf{F}$ satisfies the equation of motion

$$d{\star}\mathbf{F} = {\star}\mathbf{J}$$

(this equation obviously implies the continuity equation).

This can be derived from the action

$$S=\int_M \left[\frac{1}{2}\mathbf{F} \wedge {\star}\mathbf{F} - \mathbf{A} \wedge {\star}\mathbf{J}\right] ,$$

where $M$ is the spacetime manifold.

== p-form Abelian electrodynamics ==
We have a p-form $\mathbf{B}$, a gauge symmetry

$$\mathbf{B} \rightarrow \mathbf{B} + d\mathbf{\alpha},$$

where $\alpha$ is any arbitrary fixed (p − 1)-form and $d$ is the exterior derivative, and a gauge-invariant p-vector $\mathbf{J}$ with density 1 satisfying the continuity equation

$$d{\star}\mathbf{J} = 0 ,$$

where ${\star}$ is the Hodge star operator.

Alternatively, we may express $\mathbf{J}$ as a closed (n − p)-form.

$\mathbf{C}$ is a gauge-invariant (p + 1)-form defined as the exterior derivative $\mathbf{C} = d\mathbf{B}$.

$\mathbf{B}$ satisfies the equation of motion

$$d{\star}\mathbf{C} = {\star}\mathbf{J}$$

(this equation obviously implies the continuity equation).

This can be derived from the action

$$S=\int_M \left[\frac{1}{2}\mathbf{C} \wedge {\star}\mathbf{C} +(-1)^p \mathbf{B} \wedge {\star}\mathbf{J}\right]$$

where M is the spacetime manifold.

Other sign conventions do exist.

The Kalb–Ramond field is an example with p = 2 in string theory; the Ramond–Ramond fields whose charged sources are D-branes are examples for all values of p. In eleven-dimensional supergravity or M-theory, we have a 3-form electrodynamics.

== Non-abelian generalization ==
Just as we have non-abelian generalizations of electrodynamics, leading to Yang–Mills theories, we also have nonabelian generalizations of p-form electrodynamics. They typically require the use of gerbes.

== Asymptotic symmetries ==
The study of asymptotic symmetries began in the early 1960s with the work of Bondi, van der Burg, Metzner, and Sachs on asymptotically flat gravity. The central result was that the symmetry group at zero infinity is not simply the Poincaré group, but the BMS group, which contains an infinite number of transformations called supertranslations.

Recently, thanks in particular to the work of Strominger and collaborators, it has emerged that asymptotic symmetries are deeply connected to soft theorems and memory effects. This connection is often called the infrared triangle.

=== Physical relevance ===
Interest in studying asymptotic symmetries in p-form theories is primarily due to two factors. On the one hand, $p$-forms appear in numerous contexts of theoretical physics. In string theory, antisymmetric fields such as the Kalb-Ramond field and Ramond-Ramond forms couple to strings and D-branes. In supergravity and supersymmetric theories, $p$-forms frequently appear in field multiplets. Furthermore, $p$-forms are closely related to generalized global symmetries, or higher-form symmetries, in which the charged objects are not point particles, but extended submanifolds. For this reason, studying the asymptotic symmetries of $p$-forms means analyzing the infrared structure of theories with extended objects. The corresponding charges can contain information about soft radiation, memory, Hodge duality, topological sectors, and generalized symmetries. On the other hand, the characterization and study of asymptotic symmetries in exotic gauge theories leads to a greater understanding of gauge symmetric theories and their physical observables. The first to study asymptotic symmetries in $p$-form gauge theories were Afshar, Esmaeili, Sheikh-Jabbari in 2018 that approached the problem in $D=D_c:=2p+2$, the critical dimension. In the same year the on-shell duality between a 2-form and a scalar in $D=4$ was studied. The study of asymptotic charges of $p$-forms and the connection with on-shell duality has been studied in its generalities since 2024.

=== Technical points ===
An essential part of the analysis consists in choosing the boundary conditions, that is, the asymptotic decays of the fields as $r\to \infty$. Indeed, to study asymptotic symmetries as null infinity Bondi coordinates are introduced $(u,r,x^{i})$ with $u:=t-r$, the infinite future null is reached by taking $r\to \infty$ at a fixed $u$. The asymptotic charges are then integrals on spherical sections $S^{D-2}_u$ parameterized by the coordinates $x^{i}$. For a $p$-form in $D$ dimensions, two physically natural behaviors can be distinguished: radiative falloffs, that are associated with waves reaching null infinity with finite and non-vanishing energy, and coulombian falloffs, that are associated with fields produced by static or slowly varying sources. For a $p$-form, the two behaviors coincide in the critical dimension $D_c:=2p+2$. When $D > D_c$ radiative falloff generally dominates over Coulomb falloff, while when $D<D_c$ the opposite occurs. This distinction is crucial because it determines whether certain charges are finite, divergent, or subleading.

Another crucial point regard the residual parameters and the assumption of polyhomogeneous expansions. To study asymptotic symmetries, the Lorenz gauge is often fixed, $\nabla^{\nu} B_{\nu \mu_1...\mu_{p-1}}=0$, in order to eliminate redundancies but preserve the transformations that generate asymptotic surface charges. Residual gauge transformations must preserve both this gauge and the falloff conditions. The gauge parameter therefore satisfies a wave equation and admits an asymptotic expansion in powers of $r$. However, a relevant technical aspect, already known in higher-dimensional electrodynamics, is that to obtain parameters with arbitrary angular dependence on the celestial sphere, it is often necessary to admit polyhomogeneous expansions, that is, terms proportional to $\log r$. These terms can produce slight violations of the potential falloff, but in many cases they remain confined to the pure gauge sectors and do not modify the physical components of the force field or they do not modify observable quantities. The presence of logarithms is important because without them, some asymptotic charges would be trivialized by the equation of motion or gauge fixing.

=== Electric and magnetic charges ===
For a $p$-form, the asymptotic electric charge schematically has the form

$Q^{(e)}_p[S^{D-2}_u] \propto \oint_{S^{D-2}_u}\alpha_{i_1...i_{p-1}}C^{rui_1...i_{p-1}}d\Omega$

where $C^{rui_1...i_{p-1}}$ is the component of the force field with two indices along the radial and time-delayed directions and the remaining indices along the celestial sphere. In addition to electric charges, a $p$-form theory admits magnetic charges, constructed using Hodge duality. In $D$ dimensions, a $p$-form is on-shell dual to a $q$-form with $q=D-2-p$. At the force field level, the duality is $H_{q+1}=\star H_{p+1}$. The two theories, the one in terms of $B_p$ and the one in terms of $B_q$, describe the same on-shell degrees of freedom but have different gauge fields and gauge parameters. Asymptotically, Hodge duality maps electric charges of a description to magnetic charges of the dual description:

$Q_p^{(e)}[S^{D-2}_u] \leftrightarrow Q_q^{(m)}[S^{D-2}_u]$

For radiative data, this map connects finite and non-zero charges in both formulations. For Coulomb data, however, the situation is more subtle: a divergent charge in one description may correspond to a subleading or vanishing charge in the dual description. This suggests that the complete structure of asymptotic symmetries should be attributed not only to a single formulation of the theory but also to the set of its dual descriptions. Moreover, under topological condition such as the vanishing of suitable de Rham cohomology groups, there exists a unique duality map such that

$Q_p^{(e)}[S^{D-2}_u] \mapsto Q_q^{(e)}[S^{D-2}_u]$

and viceversa.

=== Higher-form symmetries ===
$p$-forms are naturally associated with higher-form symmetries. In an ordinary theory with global 0-form symmetry, charges act on local operators, that is, on particles. In a theory with $p$-form symmetry, however, charges act on extended operators, such as Wilson lines, Wilson surfaces or branes. Higher-form symmetry charges are typically integrals of the force field or its dual over closed loops and they depend only on the homology class of the loop : therefore are homotopical in nature. A Recent work of Manzoni on $p$-forms suggests that asymptotic charges can be viewed as a localized, or refined, version of higher-form symmetry charges at null infinity. In other words, asymptotic symmetries provide an angular resolution of global topological charges. In ordinary higher-form symmetries, the charge is obtained by integrating a closed current on a closed submanifold. In the case of $p$-forms, this current is constructed from the force field or its Hodge dual. Manzoni observes that, if we take a smeared charge, that is, a charge obtained by coupling the current to the residual gauge parameter, then in the limit $r \to \infty$ this precisely reproduces the structure of the asymptotic charge computed on the celestial sphere. In this sense, the asymptotic charge is an angularly resolved version of the topological charge of higher-form symmetry. The conclusion is that the asymptotic symmetries of the $p$-forms can be viewed as a localization at null infinity of the higher-form symmetries, with possible interpretation in terms of celestial currents and extended topological operators.

This connection is also important for celestial holography, where celestial conformal theory operators would encode infrared scattering charges in flat space, since it provides a possible solution to one of today's open questions of the flat holography program concerning the connection between asymptotic charges and higher-form symmetries.

=== Higher-order asymptotic symmetries and renormalization ===
By analogy with superrotations in gravity and subleading charges in electrodynamics, higher-order asymptotic symmetries can also be studied in p-form theories. A higher-order charge is associated with higher, or more divergent, terms in the radial expansion. A tower of charges can be schematized as $Q^{(0)}, Q^{(1)}, ..., Q^{(N)}$ where each charge is parametrized by an angular function on the celestial sphere obtained from a gauge parameter that scales as $\mathcal{O}(r^N)$. In dimension $D=p+2$ a $p$-form is on-shell dual to a scalar. In this case, using Hodge decomposition, the problem can be reduced to a scalar structure: the charges assume a universal shape, almost independent of the degree $p$, up to numerical factors.However, higher-order charges are often divergent before renormalization. To make them finite, symplectic renormalization is used, which exploits the ambiguities of the presymplectic potential. By adding appropriate counterterms to the boundary, the divergences are canceled while maintaining the physically significant finite part. This procedure is similar, in spirit, to holographic renormalization. The charge algebra thus obtained is abelian in the purely electric sector but central extensions or anomalous terms may appear in the mixed electric-magnetic sectors, or due to the residual ambiguities of symplectic renormalization.
