= Petr Hořava (physicist) =

Czech physicist

Petr Hořava (born 1963 in Prostějov) is a Czech string theorist. He is a professor of physics in the Berkeley Center for Theoretical Physics at the University of California, Berkeley, where he teaches courses on quantum field theory and string theory. Hořava is a member of the theory group at Lawrence Berkeley National Laboratory.

== Work ==
Hořava is known for his articles written with Edward Witten about the Hořava–Witten domain walls in M-theory. These articles demonstrated that the ten-dimensional heterotic $E_8 \times E_8$ string theory could be produced from 11-dimensional M-theory by making one of the dimensions have edges (the domain walls). This discovery provided crucial support for the conjecture that all string theories could arise as limits of a single higher-dimensional theory.

Hořava is less well known for his discovery of D-branes, usually attributed to Jin Dai, Robert Leigh and Joseph Polchinski, who discovered them independently, also in 1989.

In 2009, Hořava proposed a theory of gravity that separates space from time at high energy while matching some predictions of general relativity at lower energies.

== See also ==
- Hořava–Lifshitz gravity
- Hořava–Witten domain wall
- K-theory (physics)
