= Dimensional reduction =

In physics, dimensional reduction refers to the description of a system in D spacetime dimensions in terms of an exact or effective action in fewer than D dimensions.

== In field theory ==
In statistical or quantum field theory, dimensional reduction is the limit of a compactified theory where the size of the compact dimension(s) goes to zero. For a system with p compact dimensions, the excitations that survive after taking this limit are zero modes that depend on the remaining d = D - p non-compact coordinates.

For example, consider a periodic compact dimension with period L. Let x be the coordinate along this dimension. Any field $\phi$ can be described as a sum of the following terms:

$$\phi_n(x) = A_n \cos \left( \frac{2\pi n x}{L}\right)$$

with $A_n$ a constant. According to quantum mechanics, such a term has momentum $nh / L$ along x, where h is the Planck constant. Therefore, as L goes to zero, the momentum goes to infinity, and so does the energy, unless $n=0$:

$$E_n \, \propto \, \frac{n^2}{L^2}\,.$$

At finite energy E, we can therefore only excite the $n=0$ mode. So in the limit where L goes to zero, $\phi$ must be a multiple of $\phi_0$, which doesn't depend on x.

This argument generalizes. The compact dimension imposes specific boundary conditions on all fields, for example periodic boundary conditions in the case of a periodic dimension, and typically Neumann or Dirichlet boundary conditions in other cases. Now suppose the size of the compact dimension is L; then the possible eigenvalues under gradient along this dimension are integer or half-integer multiples of 1/L (depending on the precise boundary conditions). In quantum mechanics this eigenvalue is the momentum of the field, and is therefore related to its energy. As $L \rightarrow 0$ all eigenvalues except zero go to infinity, and so does the energy. Therefore, at this limit, with finite energy, zero is the only possible eigenvalue under gradient along the compact dimension, meaning that nothing depends on this dimension.

This idea applies to thermal quantum field theory, since a thermal system at high temperatures can be thought off as having a compactified circle of radius $1/T \rightarrow 0$.

== In disordered systems ==
Dimensional reduction also refers to a phenomenon in the theory of quenched disordered systems. It was put forward by Amnon Aharony, Yoseph Imry, and Shang-keng Ma, who proved in 1976 that "to all orders in perturbation expansion, the critical exponents in a d-dimensional (4 < d < 6) system with short-range exchange and a random quenched field are the same as those of a (d − 2)-dimensional pure system". Their arguments indicated that the "Feynman diagrams which give the leading singular behavior for the random case are identically equal, apart from combinatorial factors, to the corresponding Feynman diagrams for the pure case in two fewer dimensions." This dimensional reduction was investigated further in the context of supersymmetric theory of Langevin stochastic differential equations by Giorgio Parisi and Nicolas Sourlas who "observed that the most infrared divergent diagrams are those with the maximum number of random source insertions, and, if the other diagrams are neglected, one is left with a diagrammatic expansion for a classical field theory in the presence of random sources ... Parisi and Sourlas explained this dimensional reduction by a hidden supersymmetry."

== See also ==
- Compactification (physics)
- Kaluza–Klein theory
- String theory § Extra dimensions
- Supergravity
- Quantum gravity
- Supersymmetric theory of stochastic dynamics
