= NS5-brane =

Object in six-dimensional spacetime

In string theory, the NS5-brane is a fundamental extended object in six-dimensional spacetime that carries magnetic charge under the Neveu–Schwarz B-field. The tension of the NS5-brane is inversely proportional to the Newton gravitational constant, making it a solitonic object of the theory. Coincident NS5-branes cannot be described by weakly coupled string theory, making them non-perturbative. When NS5-branes are separated on a circle transverse to their worldvolume, their description is given by a particular conformal field theory due to Giveon and Kutasov. When these fivebranes rotate on a circular orbit, their description is given by more complicated conformal field theories written by Martinec and Massai. Separated fivebranes that preserve a certain fraction of supersymmetry and wiggle in space are well-described by supergravity solutions of Lunin and Mathur.
