= Kalb–Ramond field =

Two-form field

In theoretical physics in general and string theory in particular, the Kalb–Ramond field (named after Michael Kalb and Pierre Ramond), also known as the Kalb–Ramond B-field or Kalb–Ramond NS–NS B-field, is a quantum field that transforms as a two-form, i.e., an antisymmetric tensor field with two indices.

The adjective "NS" reflects the fact that in the RNS formalism, these fields appear in the NS–NS sector in which all vector fermions are anti-periodic. Both uses of the word "NS" refer to André Neveu and John Henry Schwarz, who studied such boundary conditions (the so-called Neveu–Schwarz boundary conditions) and the fields that satisfy them in 1971.

== Details ==
The Kalb–Ramond field generalizes the electromagnetic potential but it has two indices instead of one. This difference is related to the fact that the electromagnetic potential is integrated over one-dimensional worldlines of particles to obtain one of its contributions to the action while the Kalb–Ramond field must be integrated over the two-dimensional worldsheet of the string. In particular, while the action for a charged particle moving in an electromagnetic potential is given by

$$-q\int dx^\mu A_\mu$$

that for a string coupled to the Kalb–Ramond field has the form

$$-\int dx^\mu dx^\nu B_{\mu\nu}$$

This term in the action implies that the fundamental string of string theory is a source of the NS–NS B-field, much like charged particles are sources of the electromagnetic field.

The Kalb–Ramond field appears, together with the metric tensor and dilaton, as a set of massless excitations of a closed string.

== See also ==
- Curtright field
- p-form electrodynamics
- Ramond–Ramond field
