= Kathy Vivas =

Venezuelan astrophysicist

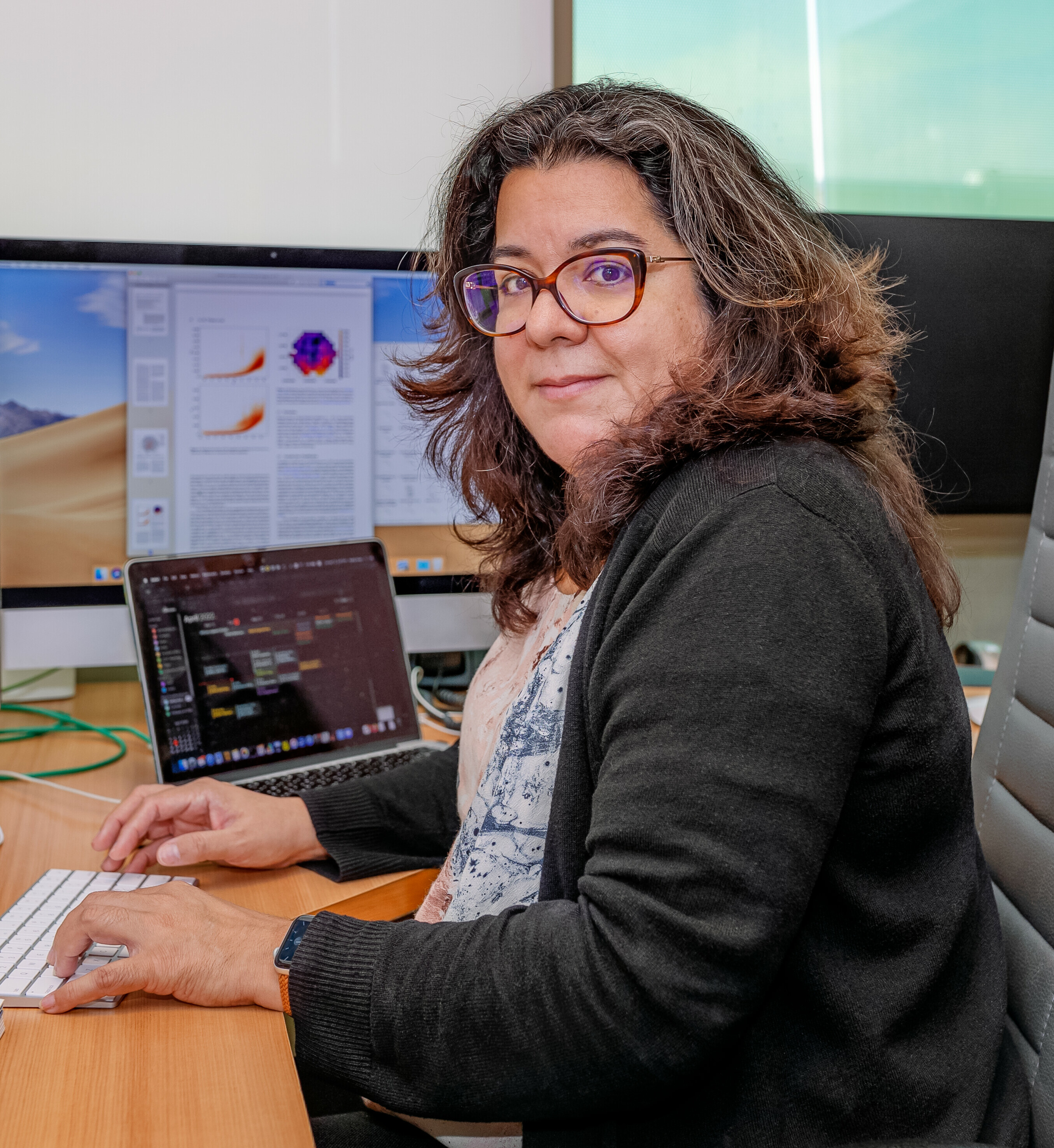
- Vivas in 2022
- Born: 1972 (age 53–54); Tovar, Venezuela
- Education: University of the Andes; Yale University
- Awards: Lorenzo Mendoza Fleury Science Prize
- Scientific career
- Fields: Astrophysics

Anna Katherina Vivas (born 1972) is a Venezuelan astrophysicist recognized for her investigations of and finding up to 100 new and very distant RR Lyrae stars. They are between 13,000 and 220,000 light years from the Sun, and are considered some of the oldest in the Milky Way. Her research has enabled some of the first studies of the structure and properties of the whole halo of the Milky Way and not only its innermost parts. The observation was made possible by combining a telescope with a large format camera, allowing astronomers to cover large portions of the sky in a short amount of time.

== Career ==
Vivas is a physics graduate from the University of the Andes and astrophysics doctor from Yale University.

From 2002 to 2013 she served as researcher of the Francisco J. Duarte Astronomy Investigation Center (Llano del Hato National Astronomical Observatory), in the village of Llano del Hato in the Venezuelan Andes, near Apartaderos, about 50 kilometers north-east of Mérida, Mérida State.

In 2009 she received the Empresas Polar Lorenzo Mendoza Fleury Science Prize.

== See also ==
- Timeline of women in science
