= Nina Grunenberg =

German author and journalist

- Born: Christine Grunenberg; 7 October 1936; Dresden, Saxony, Germany
- Died: 28 December 2017 (aged 81); Hamburg, Germany
- Occupations: Journalist-commentator; Author
- Spouse: Reimar Lüst (1923–2020)
- Children: 2 stepsons, including the theoretical physicist Dieter Lüst

Nina Grunenberg (7 October 1936 – 28 December 2017) was a German author and prize-winning journalist. Beginning her career in West Germany during the 1950s and '60s, when political journalism was largely a male prerogative, she wrote reports on social life in her country. Among others, she covered German political, social and economic affairs, also focusing frequently on science and education and writing about German elites in industry, trade unions and politics.

== Biography ==
=== Early life ===
Caroline “Nina” Grunenberg was born in Dresden, where she attended school between 1942 and 1950. She was eight and a half when World War II ended. From 1950 to 1954 she attended the “Ursulinen-Gymnasium” (a Catholic secondary school) in Cologne. After highschool she began a three year apprenticeship in the book trade in 1954.

=== Journalist ===
From 1958 to 1965 Grunenberg worked as a freelance journalist. Cologne was the West German television hub during this period, and one of the organisations she worked for was the Westdeutscher Rundfunk broadcasting organisation. She also contributed frequently to the Hamburg-based weekly newspaper Die Zeit, whose editorial staff she joined in 1961, 1965 or 1969 (sources differ). From 1965 to 1969 she was the paper’s regional correspondent for the supplement covering the federal state of North Rhine-Westphalia.

Starting in 1969, she was based at the Die Zeit's main office in Hamburg as an editor for education and academic policies. From 1974 to 1984 she was the paper's political reporter. Between 1984 and 1987, she was based in Paris, France. Following this, she was deputy editor-in-chief of Die Zeit from 1987 to 1995.

=== Later career ===
In 1992 Die Zeit set up a new section named “The Knowledge Department” (”das Ressort Wissen”). Grunenberg was assigned to head it, which she did along with her other responsibilities at the newspaper until 1994. By this time she had established special knowledge as an educational journalist.

Between 2000 and 2009 she was the first journalist to become a member of the German government’s 32-member German Science and Humanities Council. After 2009 she continued to work for the council on a consultancy basis.

Grunenberg was also a member of the PEN Centre Germany.

=== Private life ===
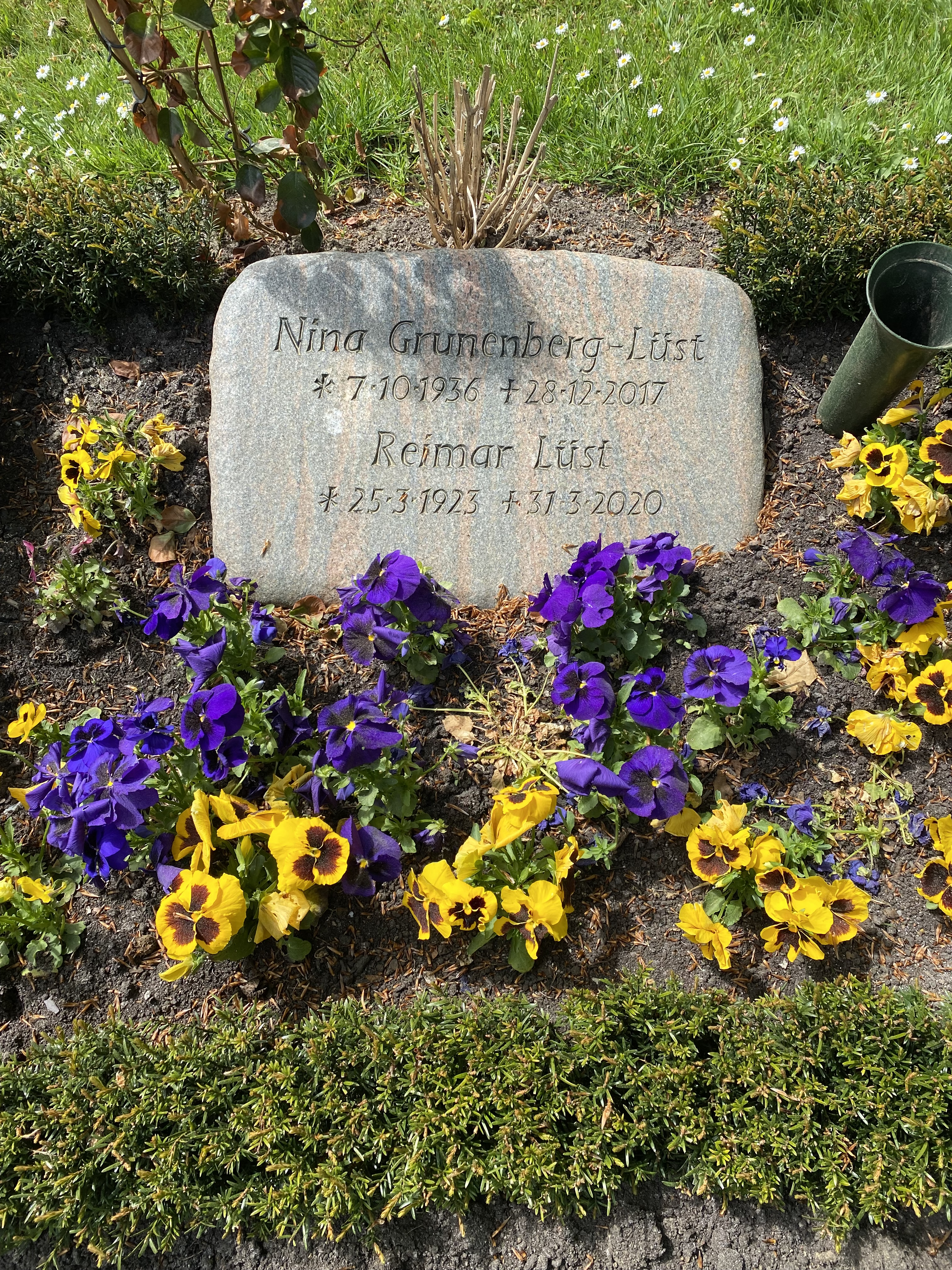
Grunenberg's gravestone

In 1986 Nina Grunenberg married, as her husband's second wife, the astrophysicist Reimar Lüst, who was president of the Max Planck Society from 1972 to 1984 and a pioneer of space research. Through this marriage, Grunenberg became mother of two adult stepsons.

Grunenberg died at Hamburg-Ohlsdorf on 28 December 2017.

== Awards ==
• 1964: Kurt Magnus Prize from the ARD broadcasting union

• 1973: Theodor Wolff Prize of the Newspaper Publishers’ Association

• 1990: Herbert Quandt Media Prize of the Johanna-Quandt Foundation.

• 2009: Theodor Wolff Prize of the Newspaper Publishers’ Association for her lifetime achievement
