= Alberto Paniz-Mondolfi =

Venezuelan scientist (born 1976)

Alberto Enrique Paniz-Mondolfi FFTM RCPS (Glasg)
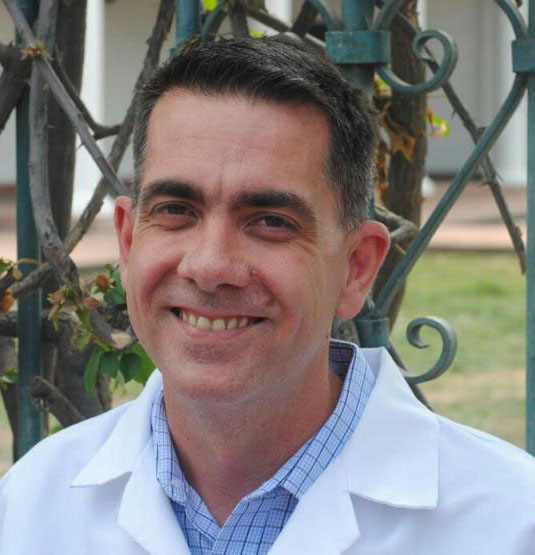
- Born: April 12, 1976 (age 50); Caracas, Venezuela
- Occupations: Scientist, medical doctor, microbiologist, pathologist

Alberto E. Paniz-Mondolfi (born April 12, 1976) is a Venezuelan pathologist, epidemiologist, and molecular medicine researcher. Currently he is a pathologist and assistant professor in New York City and is affiliated with multiple hospitals in the area, including Mount Sinai Morningside and Mount Sinai West Hospitals and Mount Sinai Hospital. Also, he is the Academic Director and Founder of The Venezuelan Science Incubator (incubadorave.org), a group focused on infectious diseases research and awareness based in Venezuela.

== History ==
Paniz-Mondolfi was born in Caracas, Venezuela in 1976. His mother is a pediatrician and his father an architect. His grandfather, Edgardo Mondolfi Otero, a biologist and zoologist. Two of his uncles were physicians with special ambitions in the field of sciences and research. His childhood was shared between Caracas and Kenya.

Paniz-Mondolfi has a master's degree in parasitology and tropical diseases; he did international fellowships in microbiology, molecular genetics, and skin disease. He also did a second medical residency in the United States in pathology. He isolated and described a new species of parasite that had infected a NY resident, and a new mycobacterium that sickened two people in Connecticut. He earned an MD and PhD and studied under Jacinto Convit the leprosy researcher.

He was a pathologist at the IDB Biomedical Research Institute in Barquisimeto, Venezuela until 2019 when he fled to the United States. He is the founder of the Venezuelan Science Incubator, an independent health research organization. Paniz-Mondolfi is assistant professor of pathology, molecular and cell-based medicine at the Mount Sinai Icahn School of Medicine. He is also affiliated with the Yale Cancer Center. In 2020 he focused his research on the COVID-19 pandemic and the effects the virus had on minority children.

His research findings have been published in several medical journals including: the European Society of Clinical Microbiology and Infectious Diseases, The American Association for the Advancement of Science, and The Lancet.

== Scholarly works ==
- Clinical, laboratory and imaging features of COVID-19: A systematic review and meta-analysis, Published in Travel Medicine and Infectious Disease, Volume 34, March–April 2020
- Central nervous system involvement by severe acute respiratory syndrome coronavirus-2 (SARS-CoV-2), Published in The Journal of Medical Virology, Volume 92 Issue 7, July 2020
- Probable Zoonotic Leprosy in the Southern United States, Published in the New England Journal of Medicine, April 28, 2011.
- ChikDenMaZika Syndrome: the challenge of diagnosing arboviral infections in the midst of concurrent epidemics, Published in Annals of Clinical Microbiology and Antimicrobials, Article 42, July 22, 2016.
- Lobomycosis in Venezuela, Published in the International Journal of Dermatology, Volume 46, Issue 22, February 2007.
- Venezuela's humanitarian crisis, resurgence of vector-borne diseases, and implications for spillover in the region, Published in The Lancet, Volume 19, Issue 5, May 2019.

== Awards and recognition ==
In 2017 Paniz-Mondolfi was awarded the Jose Gregorio Hernandez Award from the Venezuelan National Academy of Medicine

In 2019 he was awarded with the "Lorenzo Mendoza Fleury" Science Prize in Biology from Polar Enterprises Foundation in Venezuela.

In 2020 he was named as one of the People of Action Around the Globe by the Rotary Club.
