= Nuria Calvet =

Venezuelan astronomer

Núria Pilar Calvet Cuni (born 1950) is a Venezuelan astronomer who studies star formation and the evolution of protoplanetary disks around young stars. She is Helen Dodson Prince Collegiate Professor of Astronomy at the University of Michigan. She was the first woman to work as a professional astronomer in Venezuela. Calvet studies the first stages of the life of stars and of the planets around them. Some of her recent contributions include investigations of protoplanetary disk evolution, and strong evidence for how planet formation is involved in dust clearing.

== Education and career ==
Calvet was born in Caracas in 1950. After study at the Central University of Venezuela, she earned a bachelor's degree from the National Autonomous University of Mexico in 1973. She continued her studies at the University of California, Berkeley, earning a master's degree in 1975 and completing her Ph.D. in 1981. During this time, she published a paper on investigating bipolar nebulae. Her dissertation was Model atmospheres for T Tauri stars.

She worked for the Centro de Investigaciones de Astronomia in Venezuela from 1981 to 1997, becoming vice president of the center. Next, she became an astronomer at the Harvard–Smithsonian Center for Astrophysics. She moved to her present position at the University of Michigan in 2005.

== Recognition ==
Calvet was a 1979 recipient of the Dorothea Klumpke Roberts Prize, of the Department of Astronomy at the University of California, Berkeley, for outstanding achievement in early scientific research career as a graduate student.

She was a 1987 recipient of the Lorenzo Mendoza Fleury Science Prize, the highest level private-sector science award of Venezuela. She was the first woman to receive this award.
