= Anamaría Font =

Venezuelan theoretical physicist (born 1959)

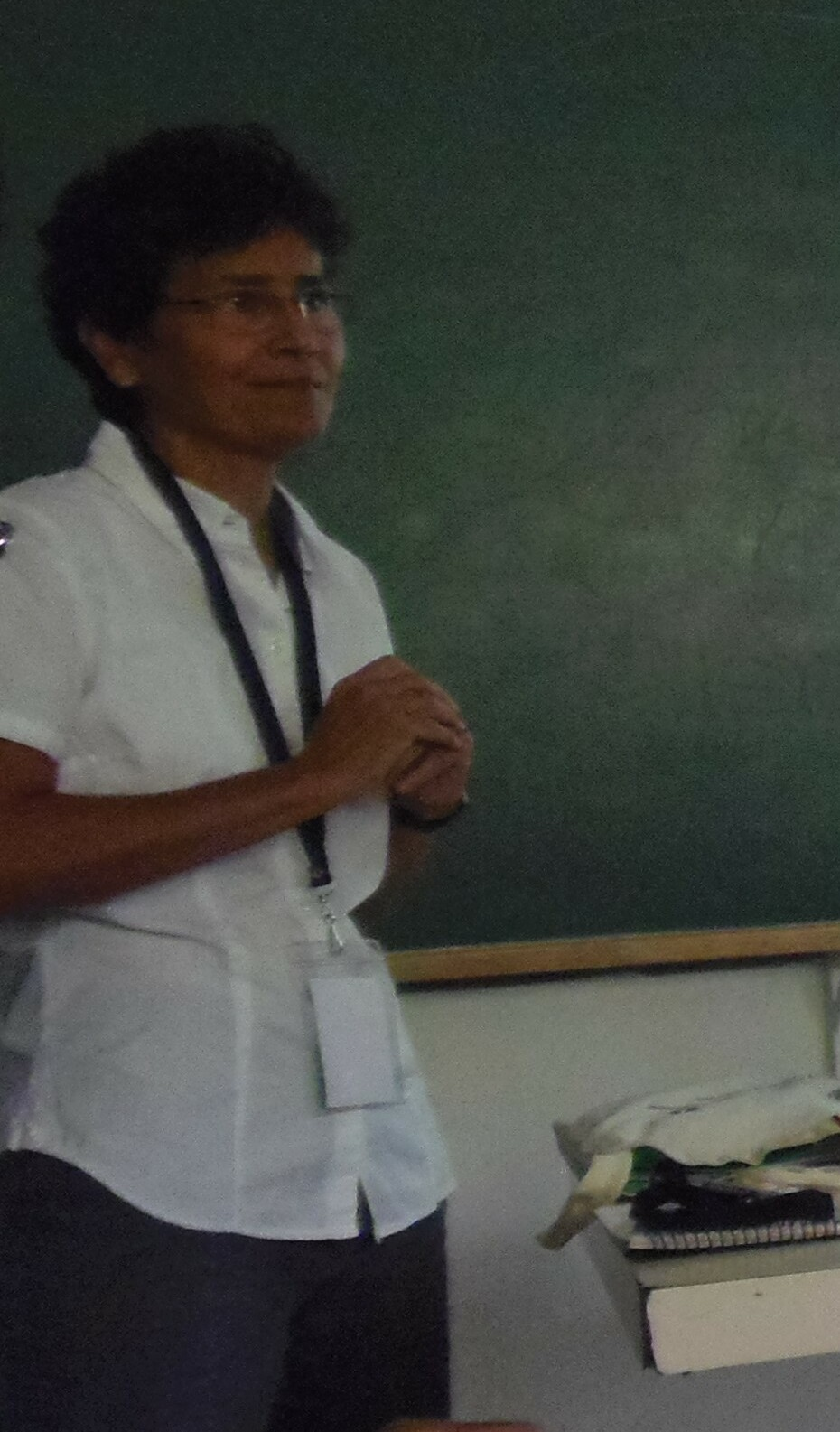
- Font lecturing in 2016
- Born: Anamaria Font Villarroel; 29 September 1959 (age 66); Anaco, Venezuela
- Education: Simon Bolivar University; University of Texas at Austin
- Known for: S-duality
- Awards: Lorenzo Mendoza Fleury Science Prize (1991); ICTP Prize (1998); L'Oréal-UNESCO For Women in Science Awards (2023)
- Scientific career
- Fields: Theoretical physics String theory
- Workplaces: Universidad Central de Venezuela
- Thesis: Four-Dimensional Supergravity Theories Arising from Superstrings (1987)
- Doctoral advisor: Austin M. Gleeson

Anamaría Font Villarroel is a Venezuelan theoretical physicist and professor of the Central University of Venezuela (UCV). Her research has been focused on models about the primordial components of matter in the context of string theory.

Font has contributed to development of Calabi–Yau dimensional compactification and she and her collaborators introduced the concept of S-duality to superstring theory, contributing to the second superstring revolution.

== Early life and education ==
Anamaría Font Villarroel was born in Anaco, Venezuela. In school she was supported by her teacher for her love of chemistry and physics. She obtained her bachelor's degree in physics, Cum Laude in 1980 from Simon Bolivar University, in Caracas, Venezuela.

== Academic career ==
Font received a PhD from the University of Texas at Austin in 1987, under the supervision of Austin M. Gleeson. Her PhD thesis was titled Four-Dimensional Supergravity Theories Arising from Superstrings. While pursuing her PhD, she received classes from Nobel Prize physicist Steven Weinberg. After completing her PhD she moved to France to work as a postdoctoral fellow in the Annecy-le-Vieux Particle Physics Laboratory (LAPP). Since 1989, she has been a physics professor at the Universidad Central de Venezuela in Caracas, Venezuela. She was also a visiting professor at the Arnold Sommerfeld Center for theoretical physics in Munich, Germany.

Her 1990 article with Luis E. Ibañez, Dieter Lüst and Fernando Quevedo titled "Strong-weak coupling duality and non-perturbative effects in string theory" had a big influence in the second superstring revolution in 1995. It was in this article where the term S-duality was first used in this context.

In 2013, Font was elected a fellow of The World Academy of Sciences (TWAS) for the advancement of science in developing countries.

Font has been actively involved in projects related to education in physics and mathematics in Venezuela and other countries. In July 2018, Physics Today magazine published an interview with Font about the status of science in Venezuela. The publication data base INSPIRE-HEP included three of her notorious publications into their data base.

She is a member of the Organization for Women in Science for the Developing World (OWSD).

Font is also a Severo Ochoa IFT (Instituto de Física Teórica) research associate.

== Personal life ==
Anamaria has 2 younger sisters, and a two half-siblings. In December 2017, Anamaria married Stefan Theisan, a physicist, after being together since 2001.

== Honors and awards ==
In 1991, Font was awarded the Lorenzo Mendoza Fleury Science Prize. Given by the country's national private industry, the prize recognizes the work of Venezuelan scientists, and is the most important scientific prize in Venezuela.

In 1998, she was awarded, jointly with Fernando Quevedo, the ICTP Prize in the field of High Energy Physics (in honour of Chen Ning Yang),

"for their contribution to the phenomenological studies in superstring theory based on orbifold compactifications and many works on Calabi–Yau compactifications, mirror symmetry and duality symmetries. These works have contributed to a greater understanding of the low energy string physics, as well as various stringy symmetries. In particular, the important concept of S-duality has been introduced by them and their collaborators."

In 2023, Font was awarded the L'Oréal-UNESCO For Women in Science Awards, representing Latin America,

recognized for her important contributions in theoretical particle physics, in particular to the study of String Theory. Her research has furthered the theory's implications for the structure of matter and quantum gravity, which is also relevant to the description of black holes and the first instants after the big bang

In November 2023, Font was named to the BBC's 100 Women list as one of the world's inspiring and influential women.

== Selected publications ==
Font has more than 50 publications with over 6000 citations. Below is a list of some of her publications.

- Font Villarroel, A (1987). Four-dimensional supergravity theories arising from superstrings (Thesis). Bibcode:1987PhDT........43F. OCLC 4434458540. OSTI 5741159.
- Font, A.; Ibáñez, L.E.; Lüst, D.; Quevedo, F. (October 1990). "Strong-weak coupling duality and non-perturbative effects in string theory". Physics Letters B. 249 (1): 35–43. Bibcode:1990PhLB..249...35F. doi:10.1016/0370-2693(90)90523-9.
- Font, A.; Ibáñez, L.E.; Lüst, D.; Quevedo, F. (August 1990). "Supersymmetry breaking from duality invariant gaugino condensation". Physics Letters B. 245 (3–4): 401–408. Bibcode:1990PhLB..245..401F. doi:10.1016/0370-2693(90)90665-S.
- Font, A.; Ibáñez, L.E.; Quevedo, F.; Sierra, A. (February 1990). "The construction of "realistic" four-dimensional strings through orbifolds". Nuclear Physics B. 331 (2): 421–474. Bibcode:1990NuPhB.331..421F. doi:10.1016/0550-3213(90)90215-Y.
- Font, A.; Ibáñez, L.E.; Quevedo, F. (September 1989). "Does proton stability imply the existence of an extra Z0?". Physics Letters B. 228 (1): 79–88. Bibcode:1989PhLB..228...79F. doi:10.1016/0370-2693(89)90529-7.
- Font, A; Ibáñez, L.E (5 February 2009). "Yukawa structure from U(1) fluxes in F-theory Grand unification". Journal of High Energy Physics. 2009 (2): 016. arXiv:0811.2157. Bibcode:2009JHEP...02..016F. doi:10.1088/1126-6708/2009/02/016. S2CID 15102984.
