= M. G. K. Menon =

Indian physicist

M. G. K. Menon FRS
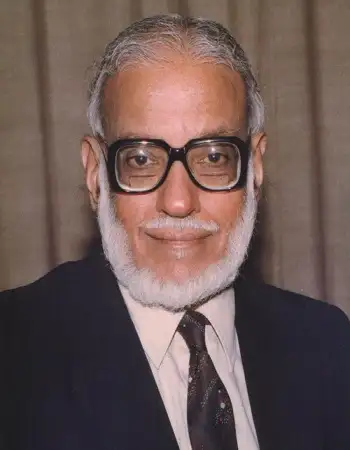

4th Director General of Defence Research and Development Organisation
- In office 1974 – 1978
- Preceded by: Basanti Dulal Nagchaudhuri
- Succeeded by: Raja Ramanna

2nd Chairman of ISRO
- In office January 1972 – September 1972
- Preceded by: Vikram Sarabhai
- Succeeded by: Satish Dhawan

Personal details
- Born: Mambillikalathil Govind Kumar Menon; 28 August 1928 Mangalore, British India (present day Mangaluru, Karnataka, India)
- Died: 22 November 2016 (aged 88)
- Children: 2
- Education: (Msc) University of Mumbai; (PhD Physics) University of Bristol
- Known for: KGF Experiments (Particle experiments at Kolar Gold Fields)
- Awards: 1996 Abdus Salam Medal; 1985 Padma Vibhushan; 1970 FRS; 1968 Padma Bhushan; 1961 Padma Shri; 1960 Shanti Swarup Bhatnagar Prize for Science and Technology
- Scientific career
- Fields: Physics
- Workplaces: Tata Institute of Fundamental Research; Indian Space Research Organisation; Defence Research and Development Organisation; Department of Science & Technology, Government of India Ministry of Earth Sciences
- Doctoral advisor: Cecil F. Powell

Mambillikalathil Govind Kumar Menon FRS (28 August 1928 – 22 November 2016) also known as M. G. K. Menon, was an Indian physicist and policy maker who served as the Chairperson of ISRO in 1972 and also served as the Director general of Defence Research and Development Organisation from 1974 to 1978. Additionally Menon has also served as the minister of state in Ministry of Earth Sciences Government of India.

Born in Mangalore, he attended the University of Bristol for his PhD in elementary particle physics under the guidance of Nobel Laureate Cecil F. Powell. He joined the TIFR in 1955.

He undertook experiments with cosmic rays to explore the properties of fundamental particles. He was actively involved in setting up balloon flight experiments, as well as deep underground experiments with cosmic ray neutrinos in the mines at Kolar Gold Fields. He was the Director of the Tata Institute of Fundamental Research, Mumbai (1966–1975), President of the Indian Statistical Institute, the Vikram Sarabhai Fellow of ISRO, President of the National Academy of Sciences, India, Chairman Board of Governors, Indian Institute of Technology, Bombay and chairman Board of Governors of the Indian Institute of Information Technology, Allahabad.

He won the Abdus Salam Award, and was a member of the Pontifical Academy of Sciences. He was one of the most prominent scientists from the state of Kerala and was elected a Fellow of the Royal Society in May 1970. The asteroid 7564 Gokumenon was named in his honour in late 2008.†

== Early life and education ==
M.G.K.Menon was born into a Malayali Menon family to Justice Sankara Menon of Kizhakkepat and Narayanikutty Amma of Mamballikalathil. He was educated at Jaswant College, Jodhpur, and the Royal Institute of Science, Bombay (now called The Institute of Science, Mumbai), before he moved to the University of Bristol for his PhD in elementary particle physics under the guidance of Nobel Laureate Cecil F. Powell in 1953.

== Career ==
Menon joined Tata Institute of Fundamental Research in 1955 "essentially because of Bhabha", and the association lasted nearly five decades. He became the director of the institute in 1966, at the age of 38, following Bhabha's untimely death. In fact, Menon began handling the affairs of the institute ever since he was 33, because of Bhabha's increasing involvement with the country's nascent atomic energy programme.

Menon was the Chairman of the Indian Space Research Organisation in 1972 and head of the Defence Research and Development Organisation from 1974 to 1978. He was a member of the Planning Commission (1982–1989), Scientific Adviser to the Prime Minister (1986–1989) and vice-president, Council of Scientific and Industrial Research (CSIR) (1989–1990).

Menon was elected as a Member of Parliament, Rajya Sabha during 1990–96. In 1989, then Prime Minister of India, Vishwanath Pratap Singh appointed him as the Minister of State for Science, Technology and Education.

== Awards and recognition ==
- He won the Abdus Salam Medal in 1996
- Special Awards: He won the Padma Shri in 1961, Padma Bhushan in 1968 and Padma Vibhushan in 1985.
- The asteroid 7564 Gokumenon was named in his honour in late 2008.

== Personal life ==
While working towards his PhD degree in particle physics at the University of Bristol under Professor Cecil F. Powell, Menon met and married Indumati Patel, who was working towards a degree in philosophy. They have two children, Anant K. Menon, Professor of Biochemistry at Weill Cornell Medicine in New York City, and Preeti Vaid, a practicing radiologist in New Delhi. Menon has one grandchild, Kartikeya M. Menon, a resident surgeon at the Mount Sinai Hospital in New York City.

Government offices
Preceded by Vikram Sarabhai	ISRO chairman Jan 1972 – Sept 1972	Succeeded by Satish Dhawan
