= Llano del Hato National Astronomical Observatory =

Coordinates: 8°47′11″N 70°52′19″W

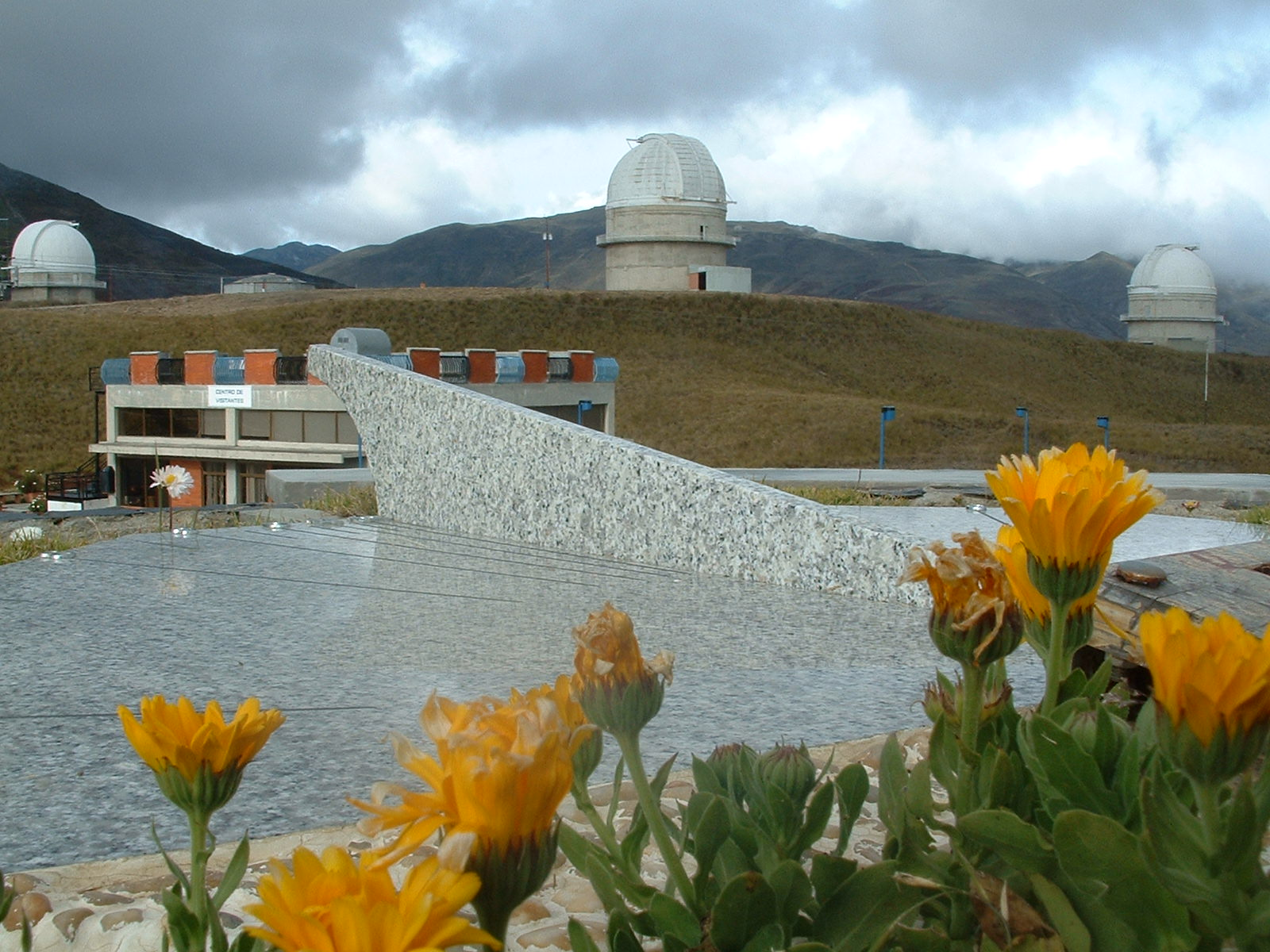
- Observatory code: 303
- Location: Mérida, Venezuela
- Altitude: 3,600 m (11,800 ft)
- Established: 1970
- Website: cida.ve
- Location of Llano del Hato National Astronomical Observatory
- Related media on Commons

The Llano del Hato National Astronomical Observatory (Spanish: OAN de Llano del Hato, or Observatorio Astronómico Nacional de Llano del Hato, code: 303) is an astronomical observatory in Venezuela. It is 3600 meters above sea level and is the country's main observatory. It is situated above the village of Llano del Hato in the Venezuelan Andes, not far from Apartaderos which lies about 50 kilometers north-east of Mérida, Mérida State.

== Description ==
This facility is the closest major optical observatory to the equator lying at 8 degrees and 47.51 minutes north. It therefore has access to most parts of both the northern and southern skies. It benefits from a very dark site, and its altitude of 3,600 meters (12,000 feet) above sea level means atmospheric turbulence is greatly reduced.

The observatory is under the auspices of the Centro de Investigaciones de Astronomia (CIDA), the main astronomical research body in Venezuela. CIDA conducts many projects in collaboration with other research organizations, academic institutions and international bodies. It also conducts valuable research in its own right and has a record that includes several important discoveries.

There are four large optical telescopes, each in its own cupola or dome: a 1-m Askania Schmidt camera (one of the largest telescopes of this type in the world), a 65-cm Zeiss refractor, a 1-m Zeiss reflector and a 50-cm Askania double astrograph. These instruments were acquired by the Venezuelan government 1954 and installed at Llano del Hato in early 1955. The observatory also has a museum and exhibition centre where visitors can learn about the work of the observatory and CIDA as well as astronomy in general.

The Quasar Equatorial Survey Team (QUEST) project is a joint venture between Yale University, Indiana University, and CIDA to photographically survey the sky. It now uses the 48 inch (1.22-m) aperture Samuel Oschin telescope at the Palomar Observatory with a digital camera, an array of 112 charge-coupled devices. Previously, it used the 1.0-metre Schmidt telescope of the Llano del Hato National Astronomical Observatory.

== List of discovered minor planets ==
At OAN de Llano del Hato, Mérida, a total of 50 minor planets have been discovered and credited to the astronomers Orlando Naranjo, Jürgen Stock, Ignacio Ferrín and Carlos Leal:

9357 Venezuela	11 January 1992	list^{[A]}
(9605) 1992 AP_{3}	11 January 1992	list^{[A]}
10344 Llanodelhato	12 February 1992	list^{[A]}^{[B]}
(11089) 1994 CS_{8}	8 February 1994	list^{[A]}
11193 Mérida	11 December 1998	list^{[A]}
12359 Cajigal	22 September 1993	list^{[A]}
12360 Unilandes	22 September 1993	list^{[A]}
12366 Luisapla	8 February 1994	list^{[A]}
12367 Ourinhos	8 February 1994	list^{[A]}
12758 Kabudari	22 September 1993	list^{[A]}
(14005) 1993 SO_{3}	22 September 1993	list^{[A]}
(14918) 1994 BP_{4}	21 January 1994	list^{[A]}
15050 Heddal	12 December 1998	list^{[A]}
15453 Brasileirinhos	12 December 1998	list^{[A]}
(16565) 1992 CZ_{1}	12 February 1992	list^{[A]}^{[B]}
16645 Aldalara	22 September 1993	list^{[A]}
17494 Antaviana	11 January 1992	list^{[A]}
(17873) 1998 XO_{96}	11 December 1998	list^{[A]}
(23501) 1992 CK_{1}	12 February 1992	list^{[A]}^{[B]}
(29691) 1998 XH_{96}	11 December 1998	list^{[A]}
(29692) 1998 XE_{97}	11 December 1998	list^{[A]}
(31384) 1998 XE_{96}	11 December 1998	list^{[A]}
(31385) 1998 XF_{96}	11 December 1998	list^{[A]}
(35678) 1998 XW_{96}	11 December 1998	list^{[A]}
38628 Huya	10 March 2000	list^{[C]}
(48565) 1994 CA_{9}	8 February 1994	list^{[A]}
(49430) 1998 XZ_{96}	11 December 1998	list^{[A]}
(56065) 1998 XB_{97}	12 December 1998	list^{[A]}

(59151) 1998 XK_{96}	12 December 1998	list^{[A]}
(66189) 1998 XA_{97}	12 December 1998	list^{[A]}
74400 Streaky	11 December 1998	list^{[A]}
79864 Pirituba	11 December 1998	list^{[A]}
79889 Maloka	8 January 1999	list^{[A]}
(91210) 1998 XS_{96}	11 December 1998	list^{[A]}
(96609) 1999 AQ_{35}	9 January 1999	list^{[A]}
(120997) 1998 XT_{96}	11 December 1998	list^{[A]}
127870 Vigo	24 March 2003	list^{[C]}^{[D]}
128166 Carora	27 August 2003	list^{[C]}^{[D]}
(137096) 1998 XG_{97}	11 December 1998	list^{[A]}
149528 Simónrodríguez	24 March 2003	list^{[C]}^{[D]}
159776 Eduardoröhl	2 May 2003	list^{[C]}^{[D]}
161278 Cesarmendoza	24 March 2003	list^{[C]}^{[D]}
189310 Polydamas	3 January 2006	list^{[C]}
196476 Humfernandez	2 May 2003	list^{[C]}^{[D]}
201497 Marcelroche	2 May 2003	list^{[C]}^{[D]}
(237422) 1999 AF_{35}	9 January 1999	list^{[A]}
347940 Jorgezuluaga	30 March 2003	list^{[C]}^{[D]}
366272 Medellín	30 March 2003	list^{[C]}^{[D]}
(368628) 2004 UJ_{10}	20 October 2004	list^{[E]}
(423624) 2005 WZ_{156}	27 November 2005	list^{[C]}
Co-discovery made with:^{A} O. A. Naranjo^{B} J. Stock^{C} I. R. Ferrín^{D} C. Leal^{E} anomaly in MPC's data base as discovery observation was made by A84 in Turkey
