= Abdus Salam Medal =

- Location: Trieste
- Country: Italy
- Presented by: Third World Academy of Sciences
- First award: 1995
- Final award: 2015
- Currently held by: Jacob Palis

The Abdus Salam Medal (Official: Abdus Salam Medal for Science and Technology) is an award presented by The World Academy of Sciences in Trieste. It "is awarded to highly distinguished personalities who have served the cause of science in the Developing World."

== Recipients ==
| Year | Name | Country |
|---|---|---|
| 1995 | Federico Mayor Zaragoza | Spain |
| 1996 | M. G. K. Menon | India |
| 1998 | Thomas R. Odhiambo | Kenya |
| 2000 | José I. Vargas | Brazil |
| 2002 | Paolo Budinich | Italy |
| 2005 | Lu Yongxiang | China |
| 2008 | C. N. R. Rao | India |
| 2012 | Mohamed H.A. Hassan | Sudan |
| 2015 | Jacob Palis | Brazil |
| 2018 | Fernando Quevedo | GuatemalaSpain |
| 2022 | Chunli Bai | China |
