= Lorenzo Mendoza Fleury Science Prize =

Lorenzo Mendoza Fleury

The Lorenzo Mendoza Fleury Science Prize, also known as the "Premio Fundación Empresas Polar" is the most important award offered by the private sector to contemporary scientists from Venezuela who have shown outstanding talent, creativity and productivity during a given period.

== History ==
The prize was created in 1982 by "Fundación Empresas Polar" and is named after the founder of Empresas Polar, a Venezuelan corporation owning one of the largest breweries in the country but whose operations also include an array of industries, mostly related to food processing and packaging. The award was established as part of the Corporate social responsibility of the group. Every two years since 1983 the prize has been systematically awarded to Venezuelan scientists in the fields of Biology, Physics, Mathematics, Chemistry and their interdisciplines. For each biennial edition, the Board of Directors of Empresas Polar Foundation appoints a Selection Committee composed of seven scientists having extensive academic experience in their respective research fields. This committee then propose candidates, evaluate nominees, select winners, and write and submit the verdict to the Board of Polar Foundation. The selection process evaluates the talent, creativity and productivity of each candidate in their respective specialties. Besides giving public recognition to the awardees, the prize also includes a diploma and a freely spendable amount of cash to each one of them.

== Award statistics ==
Since the prize started its first edition in 1983, there have been 90 awardees, including 15 women, with the following specialties: Biology:32, Physics:21, Mathematics:18 and Chemistry:18. Awardees have been members of the following institutions:

- Instituto Venezolano de Investigaciones Científicas (IVIC): 31
- Universidad Central de Venezuela (UCV): 18
- Universidad de Los Andes (ULA): 17
- Universidad Simón Bolívar (USB): 13
- Centro de Investigaciones de Astronomia (CIDA): 4
- Universidad de Oriente (UDO): 2
- Universidad de Carabobo (UC): 1
- IBM: 1
- Intevep: 1
- Universidad del Zulia (LUZ): 1
- Instituto de Estudios Avanzados (IDEA): 1

== Award recipients ==
The list of scientists who have received the prize is shown below:

- I. 1983
  - José Luis Ávila Bello
  - Reinaldo Di Polo
  - Carlos Di Prisco
  - Heinz Krentzien
  - Miguel Octavio
- II. 1985
  - Miguel Alonso
  - Rodrigo Arocena
  - Luis Herrera Cometta
  - Klaus Jaffé
  - Ernesto Medina
- III. 1987
  - Gustavo Bruzual
  - Núria Calvet Cuni
  - Carlos Caputo
  - Gerardo Mendoza
  - Gustavo Ponce
- IV. 1989
  - Rafael Apitz
  - Julio Fernández
  - Claudio Mendoza
  - Manuel Rieber
  - Roberto Sánchez Delgado
- V. 1991
  - Anamaría Font Villarroel
  - Narahari Joshi
  - Leonardo Mateu
  - Raúl Padrón
  - Carlos Schubert
- VI. 1993
  - Miguel Méndez
  - Ernesto Medina D.
  - Leonardo Enrique Mora
  - Fernando Ruette
  - Benjamín Scharifker
- VII. 1995
  - Luigi Cubeddu
  - Luis Hernández
  - Ferdinand Liprandi
  - Alejandro Müller
  - Hebertt Sira
- VIII. 1997
  - José Rafael León R.
  - Carlos G. Rincón Ch.
  - Egidio L. Romano R.
  - Antonio R. Tineo Bello
  - Julio A. Urbina R.
- IX. 1999
  - Luis Báez Duarte
  - Wilmer Olivares Rivas
  - Álvaro Restuccia Núñez
  - Bernardo Rodríguez Iturbe
  - Víctor Villalba Rojas
- X. 2001
  - Anwar Hasmy
  - Hugo Leiva
  - Jesús A. León
  - Vladimiro Mujica
  - Irene Pérez Schael
- XI. 2003
  - Sócrates Acevedo
  - Yosslen Aray
  - Jesús González
  - José Rafael López Padrino
  - Lázaro Recht
- XII. Year 2005.
  - Manuel Bautista, physics
  - Pedro Berrizbeitia, mathematics
  - José Bubis, biology
  - José Luis Paz, chemist
  - Félix J. Tapia, biology
- XIII. Year 2007.
  - Carlos Uzcátegui, mathematics
  - María Antonieta Sobrado, biology
  - Alejandra Melfo, physics
  - Gustavo Benaím, biology
  - Juan Anacona, chemistry
- XIV. Year 2009.
  - Mireya Rincón de Goldwasser, chemistry
  - Stefania Marcantognini, mathematics
  - Flor Hélène Pujol, biology
  - Anna Katherina Vivas Maldonado, astrophysics
  - Juan B. De Sanctis, biochemistry
- XV. Year 2011.
  - Carenne Ludeña Cronick, mathematics
  - César Briceño Ávila, physics
  - César Lodeiros Seijo, biology
  - Joaquín Brito Gonzálvez, chemistry
  - Luis Rincón Hernández, chemistry
- XVI. Year 2013.
  - Trino Baptista, biology
  - Ismardo Bonalde, physics
  - Jimmy Castillo, chemistry
  - Jon Paul Rodríguez, biology
  - Víctor Sirvent, mathematics
- XVII. Year 2015.
  - Mario Cosenza (physics, ULA),
  - Liliana López (chemistry, UCV),
  - Patricia Miloslavich (biology, USB),
  - Ramón Pino (mathematics, ULA)
  - Fermín Rada (biology, ULA)
- XVIII. Year 2017.
  - Rafael Almeida (chemistry, ULA),
  - Gloria Buendía (physics, USB),
  - Yamilet Quintana (mathematics, USB)
  - Pedro Rada (biology, ULA)
  - Wilmer Tezara (biology, UCV)
- XVIII. Year 2019.
  - María Eugenia Grillet
  - Henryk Gzyl
  - Jafet Nassar
  - Alberto Paniz Mondolfi
