= Quasar Equatorial Survey Team =

Astronomical survey in Venezuela

The Quasar Equatorial Survey Team (QUEST) is a joint venture between Yale University, Indiana University, and Centro de Investigaciones de Astronomia (CIDA) to photographically survey the sky using a digital camera, an array of 112 charge-coupled devices. Since 2009, it has used the 1 m ESO Schmidt Telescope in Chile. From 2003–2007, it used the 48 inch (1.22 m) Samuel Oschin telescope at the Palomar Observatory. Before that, it had used the 1.0-metre Schmidt telescope at the Llano del Hato National Astronomical Observatory in Venezuela.
