= Fernando Quevedo =

Guatemalan physicist (born 1956)

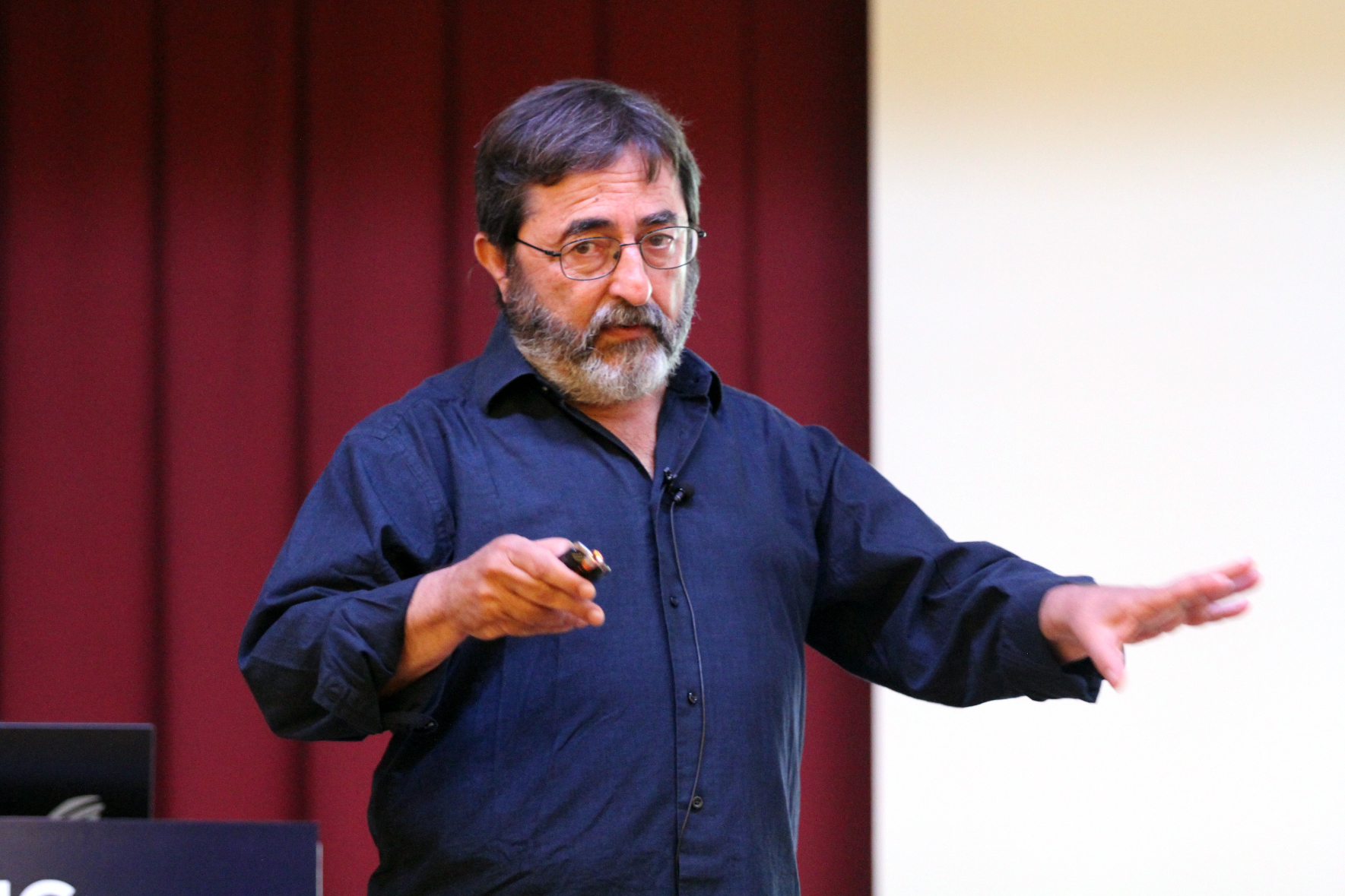
- Born: May 12, 1956 (age 70); San José, Costa Rica
- Citizenship: Guatemala and Spain
- Education: University of Texas at Austin, Universidad del Valle de Guatemala
- Known for: S-duality
- Awards: ICTP Prize (1998); Abdus Salam Medal (2017); John Wheatley Prize (2021)
- Scientific career
- Thesis: Topics in supergravity and superstring phenomenology (1986)
- Doctoral advisor: Steven Weinberg

Fernando Quevedo Rodríguez (born 12 May 1956 in San José, Costa Rica) is a Guatemalan physicist and obtained his early education in Guatemala. He was the director of the Abdus Salam International Centre for Theoretical Physics (ICTP) between October 2009 and November 2019. With Anamaría Font, Luis E. Ibáñez, and Dieter Lüst, he proposed a weak-strong duality conjecture which introduced the concept of S-duality in 1990.

== Education ==
He obtained his BSc in physics from the Universidad del Valle de Guatemala in 1979, and his Ph.D. from the University of Texas at Austin in 1986 under the supervision of Nobel laurate Steven Weinberg.

== Career ==
Following a string of research appointments at CERN, Switzerland, McGill University in Canada, Institut de Physique in Neuchatel, Switzerland, and the Los Alamos National Laboratory, USA, as well as a brief term as professor of physics at the National Autonomous University of Mexico (UNAM). Dr. Quevedo later joined the Department of Applied Mathematics and Theoretical Physics at the University of Cambridge, UK, in 1998, where he has been Professor of Theoretical Physics and Fellow of Gonville and Caius College. He has taught courses on the Standard Model, differential equations, complex methods, supersymmetry and extra dimensions. He has discussed the importance of international research institutions for science diplomacy. He has authored more than 100 papers.

== Honors and awards ==
He has been awarded the Royal Society Wolfson Research Merit Award, Doctorate Honoris Causa from Universidad de San Carlos de Guatemala and Universidad del Valle de Guatemala, John Solomon Guggenheim Foundation Fellowship and, alongside Anamaría Font, won the 1998 ICTP Prize. He has been a fellow of the World Academy of Sciences since 2010.

- 1998: John Simon Guggenheim Foundation Fellowship
- 1998: ICTP Prize in High Energy Physics, Trieste, Italy
- 2000: Doctorate Honoris Causa, Universidad de San Carlos de Guatemala
- 2003: Royal Society Wolfson Merit Award, Royal Society, UK
- 2006: Doctorate Honoris Causa, Universidad del Valle de Guatemala
- 2010: Distinguished Guatemalan award, Guatemala City Mayor
- 2010: Fellow, The World Academy of Sciences
- 2013: Doctorate Honoris Causa, Universidad de Chiapas, Mexico
- 2017: Salvador Allende Award, Chile Embassy in Italy
- 2018: Abdus Salam Medal, The World Academy of Sciences
- 2019: Spirit of Abdus Salam Award
- 2020–2026: Distinguished Visiting Research Chair, Perimeter Institute for Theoretical Physics, Canada
- 2021: John Wheatley Prize, American Physical Society
