= Heiko Engelkes =

German journalist (1933–2008)

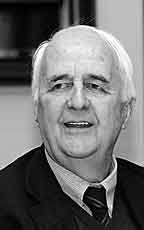
Heiko Engelkes (2007)

Heiko Engelkes (1 April 1933 – 6 November 2008) was a German journalist.

Born in Norden, he studied law, political science and journalism in Wilhelmshaven, Hamburg and Berlin. Following this he spent time as a Fulbright scholar at the William Allan White School of Journalism of the University of Kansas.

He began his career as a journalist in 1956, freelancing for the Norddeutscher Rundfunk, the local public broadcaster for Hamburg and surrounding areas of the Federal Republic, and for the Deutsches Allgemeines Sonntagsblatt, a weekly newspaper published by the Evangelical Church in Germany. In 1960 he switched to the Westdeutscher Rundfunk, a public broadcaster based in Cologne, and became part of the editorial team of the Tagesschau, the broadcaster’s news service. He became head of the editorial team in 1965.

In 1974 he moved to Paris as an ARD correspondent, taking over the leadership of ARD’s studio there in 1978. After five years there he returned to Germany in 1983, becoming Second-Editor-in-Chief of ARD-aktuell, the broadcaster’s central TV news bureau. He returned to Paris as local chief at the ARD studio in 1991, remaining there until his retirement in 1998.

He died in Cologne on 6 November 2008 from cancer.

== Bibliography (selected) ==
- Mitterrand, aus der Nähe gesehen. Econ Verlag, München 1983, ISBN 3-430-12520-0
- Bonjour, Paris : mein Leben mit Frankreich. Lübbe Verlag 1999, ISBN 3-7857-0986-2
- König Jacques. Chiracs Frankreich. Aufbau-Verlag, Berlin 2005, ISBN 3-351-02598-X
- Ségolène Royal. Aufbau-Verlag, Berlin 2007, ISBN 3-351-02648-X

== Honours ==
- 1987: Chévalier of the Légion d'honneur
- 1998: Adenauer-de Gaulle Prize
- 2005: German Federal Cross of Merit I. Klasse
