= Reimar Lüst =

German astrophysicist (1923–2020)

- Born: 25 March 1923; Barmen, Prussia, Germany
- Died: 31 March 2020 (aged 97)
- Education: University of Frankfurt am Main; University of Göttingen; University of Chicago; Princeton University
- Children: 2, including Dieter Lüst
- Awards: Adenauer-de Gaulle Prize; Légion d’Honneur; Order of Merit of the Federal Republic of Germany.
- Scientific career
- Fields: Astrophysics
- Workplaces: European Space Research Organisation (ESRO); Max Planck Society; European Space Agency (ESA); Alexander von Humboldt Foundation; Jacobs University Bremen
- Doctoral advisor: Carl Friedrich von Weizsäcker

Reimar Lüst (German: [ˈʁaɪmaʁ ˈlyːst]; 25 March 1923 – 31 March 2020) was a German astrophysicist. He worked in European space science from its beginning, as the scientific director of the European Space Research Organisation (ESRO) from 1962 and as Director General of the European Space Agency (ESA) from 1984 until 1990.

Lüst taught internationally and influenced German politics as chairman of the Wissenschaftsrat from 1969 to 1972. He was the president of the German Max Planck Society from 1972 to 1984. As chairman of the board of Jacobs University Bremen, he shaped the international school towards excellence. His awards include Officer of the Légion d’Honneur and the Grand Cross of the Order of Merit of the Federal Republic of Germany.

== Life ==
Lüst was born on 25 March 1923 in Barmen (now part of Wuppertal) in North Rhine-Westphalia. At age 10, he attended the Humanistisches Gymnasium in Kassel, but his education was interrupted in 1941 by military service with the German Navy (Kriegsmarine) during World War II. In the navy, he served as a lieutenant engineer on U-528. He survived her sinking and was a prisoner-of-war in England and the U.S. from 1943 to 1946. He began studies while imprisoned.

After being released, Lüst returned to his education in 1946. He received his B.S. in physics from the University of Frankfurt am Main in 1949 and his doctorate from the University of Göttingen in 1951, supervised by Carl Friedrich von Weizsäcker. He was an assistant at the Max Planck Institute in Göttingen from 1951. He was selected as a Fulbright Fellow at the Enrico Fermi Institute of the University of Chicago, and at Princeton University in 1955/56. He was a professor at New York University, the Massachusetts Institute of Technology (MIT), and the California Institute of Technology (Caltech) in Pasadena. He is credited with contributions on the "origins of the planetary system, solar physics, the physics of cosmic rays, plasma physics, hydrodynamics and to the physics of nuclear fusion".

Lüst was interested in European space science from the beginning on the "Commission préparatoire européenne de recherches spatiales" (COPERS). He began as Secretary of the Scientific and Technical Working Group and became Scientific Director of the European Space Research Organisation (ESRO) in 1962, where he influenced the scientific programme until 1964. He was its vice president from 1968 to 1970. Lüst was chairman of the Wissenschaftsrat, an advisory board for German national and state politics, from 1969 to 1972. For ESRO, he was involved in sounding rocket launches and with satellites for studies of the upper atmosphere and the planetary medium, directing experiments on the ESRO-IV, HEOS-A and COS-B satellites.

Lüst was president of the German Max Planck Society from 1972 to 1984 and the third Director General of the European Space Agency (ESA) from 1984 until 1990. Afterwards, he served as president and later honorary president of the Alexander von Humboldt Foundation in Bonn, as a professor at the University of Hamburg, and as chairman and, from 2005, honorary chairman of the board of the international Jacobs University Bremen.

Lüst was married to Nina Grunenberg (1936–2017) and had two sons from his first marriage to Rhea Lüst. He died on 31 March 2020, days after his 97th birthday.

== Awards ==
Lüst received the Austrian Wilhelm Exner Medal in 1987. The minor planet (4386) 6829 P-L was named "Lüst" after him. In 1995, he was awarded the Adenauer-de Gaulle Prize for French–German collaboration in 1994, and the Weizman Award in the Sciences and Humanities, from the Weizmann Institute of Science, in 1995. He was an Officer of the Légion d’Honneur and was awarded the Grand Cross of the Order of Merit of the Federal Republic of Germany.

During the 10th anniversary celebrations of Jacobs University Bremen, he was awarded the university's first honorary doctorate for his outstanding achievements in space research as well as his successes as a science manager. The award further recognized Lüst's key role in the planning and development at the university as chairman of the planning committee. Lüst was pivotal in shaping the unique profile of Jacobs University, which was rated among the best universities in Germany by the Center for Higher Education Development (CHE) at the Bertelsmann Stiftung.

Preceded by Adolf Butenandt	Director of Max Planck Society; 1972–1984	Succeeded by Heinz Staab
