= Apartaderos =

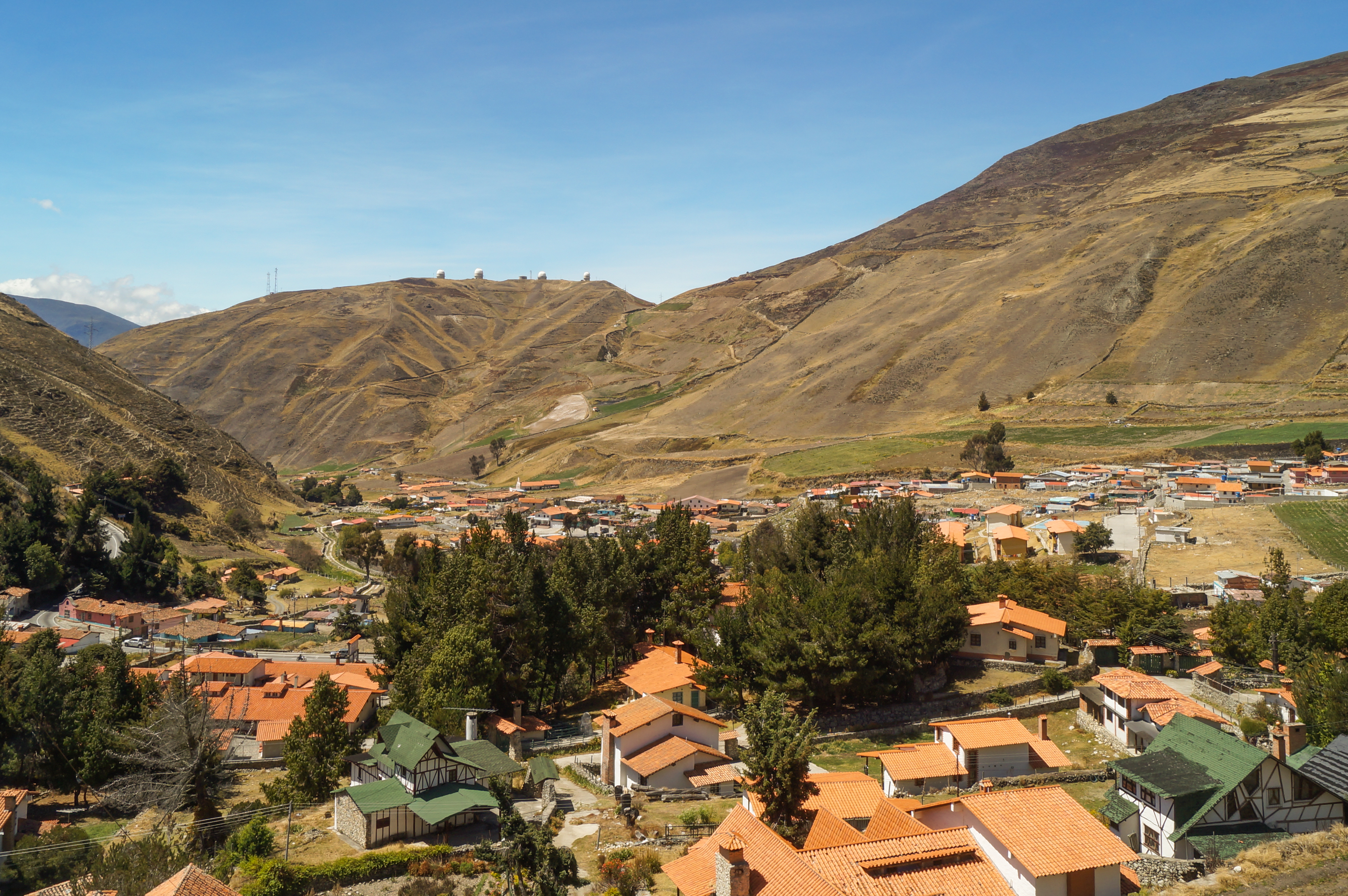
- Apartaderos

- Location within Venezuela
- Coordinates: 8°55′00″N 71°05′00″W
- Country: Venezuela
- States: Mérida
- Municipalities: Rangel Municipality
- Elevation: 3,505 m (11,499 ft)

Population
  - Total: 3,541
- Time zone: UTC-4
- Postal Code: 5130
- Area code: +58 274

Apartaderos is a small Andean town in Mérida State, Venezuela.

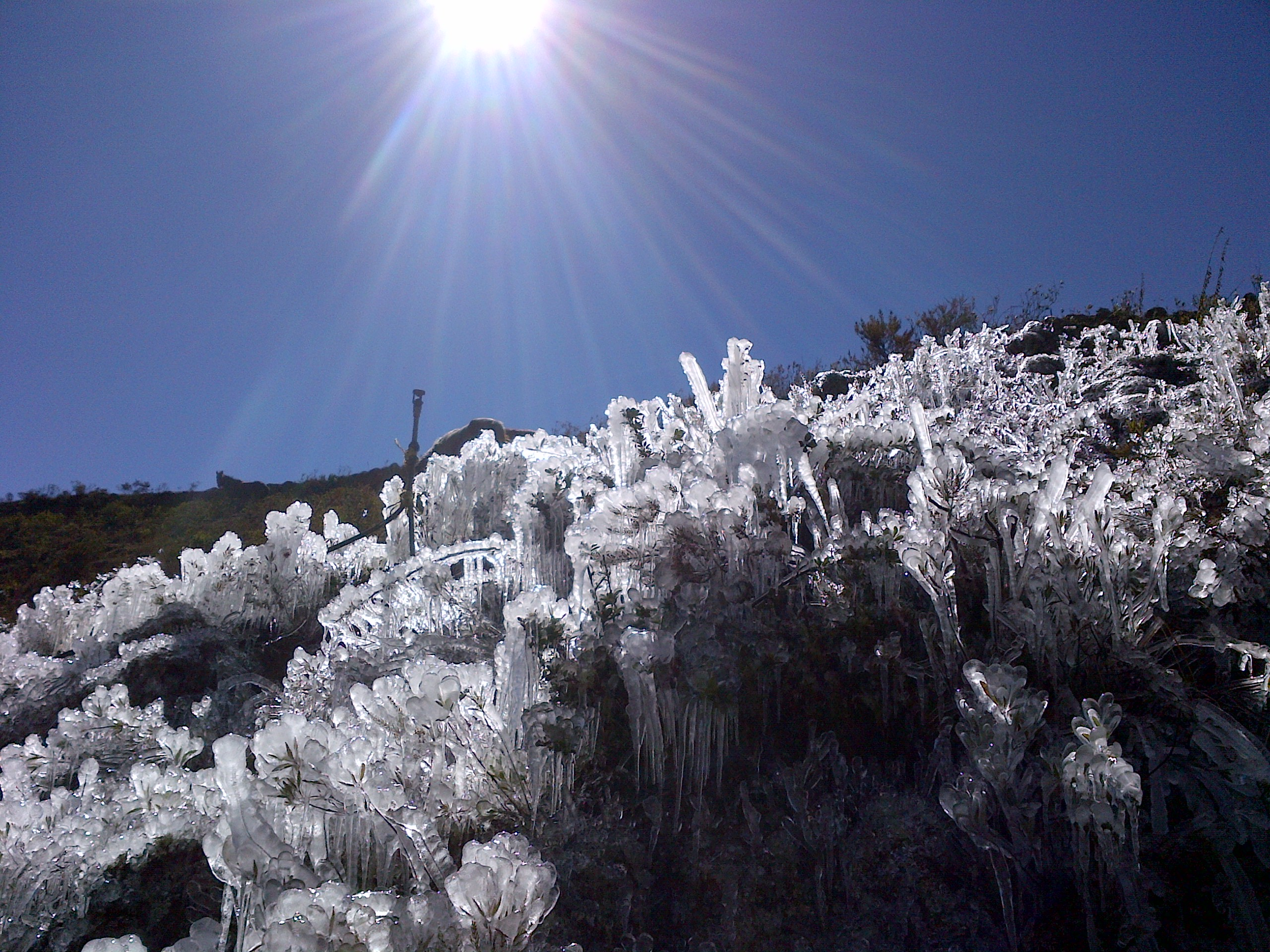
Ground frost in Apartaderos. Because its location in an alpine tundra ecosystem called páramo, they often undergo a sudden and drastic change in a daily freeze-and-thaw cycle, sometimes described as "summer every day and winter every night."

Located at an altitude of 3,505 metres (11,499 ft), it is the highest town in Venezuela, surrounded by páramo vegetation, the town has tourism facilities such as restaurants, gift shops and small hotels. In addition to tourism the main activities are agriculture, flower cultivation and crafts. It can be reached from Mérida city and Valera by the Transandean Highway, which reaches its highest point at 4,000 metres (13,000 ft) in El Collado del Cóndor (also known as Pico El Águila by the locals) a couple of minutes from the town. In terms of climate, January, the coldest month, averages 2.5 °C (36.5 °F), while the hottest month, June, averages 11 °C (52 °F). Apartaderos has an Alpine tundra climate (Köppen: ET), the yearly average is 6.9 °C (44.4 °F) with the average temperature of the warmest month below the 10 °C (50 °F).

Apartaderos sits at the intersection of three river valleys: the Chama which flows down to the city of Mérida, the Santo Domingo which flows to Los Llanos (plains) of Barinas, and the Motatán, which flows to the city of Valera. The striking landscape around Apartaderos has inspired native American myth and poetry.

== See also ==
- List of highest towns by country
