= Adenauer-de Gaulle Prize =

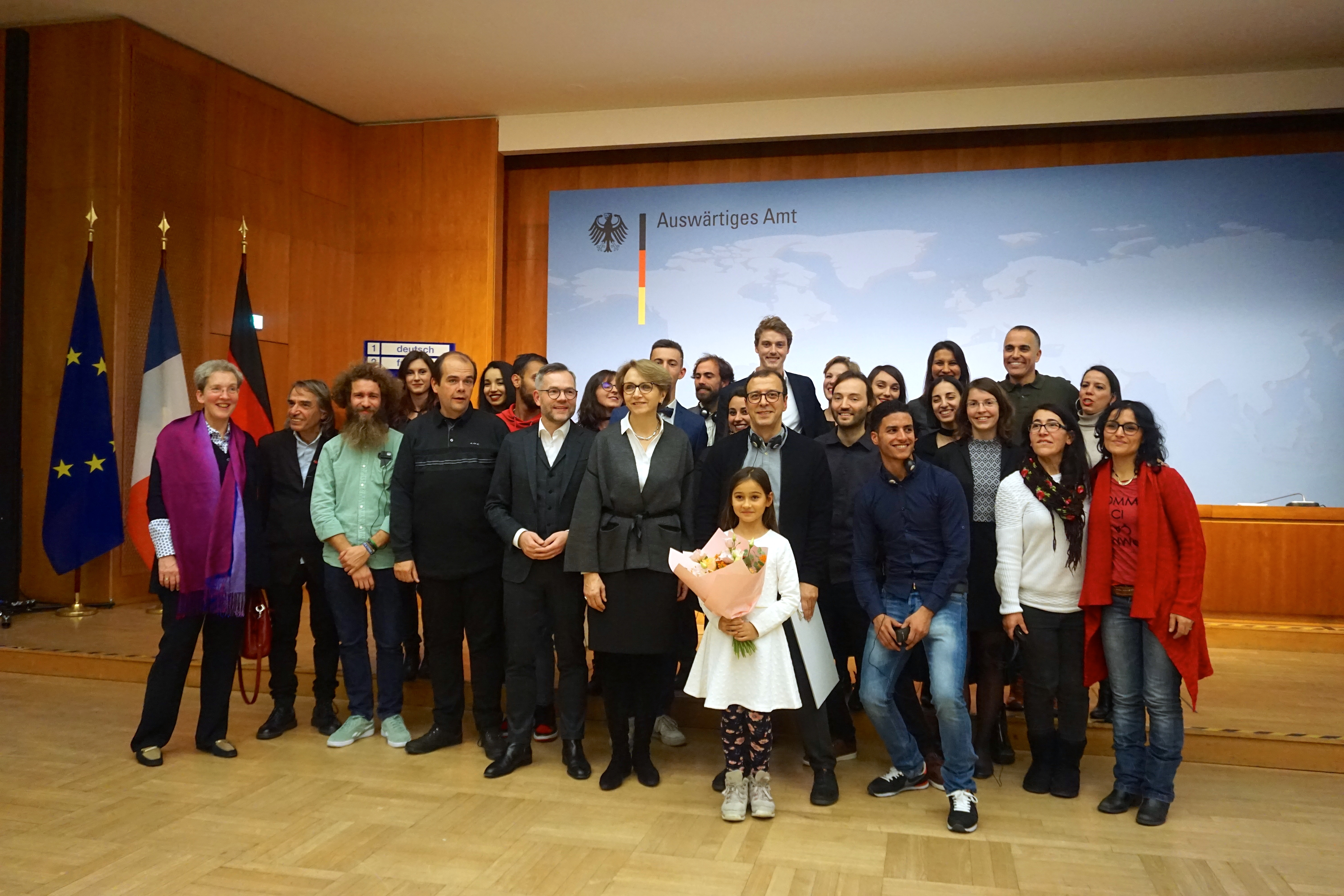
- Presentation of Prize 2019 in Berlin to the association Une Terre Culturelle by the Minister of State for European Affairs, Michael Roth, and the French Ambassador to Germany, Anne-Marie Descôtes.
- Awarded for: exceptional contribution to French-German cooperation
- Location: Paris/Berlin
- Country: France/Germany
- Presented by: governments
- Reward: €10,000
- First award: 1989
- Website: france-allemagne.fr/fr/le-couple-franco-allemand/les-prix-et-distinctions-franco-allemands

The Adenauer-de Gaulle Prize (German: Adenauer-de Gaulle-Preis, French: Prix de Gaulle-Adenauer) is an award given to French or German figures and institutions that have made an exceptional contribution to French-German cooperation. It is named after Germany's former Chancellor Konrad Adenauer and France's former President Charles de Gaulle. They worked for a reconciliation between the two European countries. This reconciliation was sealed by the Élysée Treaty in 1963. The prize is endowed with €10,000 and awarded alternatively in Germany and France. The award was established on 22 January 1988 (25th anniversary Élysée Treaty) by the German and French governments.

== Recipients ==
- 1989: Bureau International de Liaison et de Documentation and Gesellschaft für übernationale Zusammenarbeit
- 1990: Ludwigsburg and Montbéliard
- 1992: Alfred Toepfer and Germanist Pierre Grappin
- 1993: Heidelberg and Montpellier
- 1994: Reimar Lüst and senator Pierre Laffitte
- 1996: Hans Lutz Merkle (Robert Bosch GmbH) and Airbus Industrie
- 1997: Hans Stercken and Brigitte Sauzay
- 1998: Heiko Engelkes and Anne-Marie Denizot
- 1999: Hanna Schygulla and Patricia Kaas
- 2000: Ulrich Wickert and Daniel Vernet
- 2001: Anneliese Knoop-Graf and Hélène Viannay
- 2002: Rhineland-Palatinate / Burgundy
- 2003: DeutschMobil and FranceMobile (language promotion)
- 2004: Audrey Tautou and Daniel Brühl
- 2005: Helmut Schmidt and Valéry Giscard d'Estaing
- 2006: Helmut Kohl and Jacques Delors
- 2008: Anselm Kiefer and Christian Boltanski
- 2011: Kurt Masur and Pierre Boulez
- 2012: Edzard Reuter and Jean François-Poncet
- 2013: Franco-German Youth Office
- 2014: Arte
- 2016: Verdun
- 2017: vocational schools of Kehl
- 2018: Zweierpasch (Hip-Hop band)
- 2019: Une Terre Culturelle (NGO)
- 2020: DRF Luftrettung and Luxembourg Air Rescue
