= Dieter Lüst =

German physicist (born 1956)

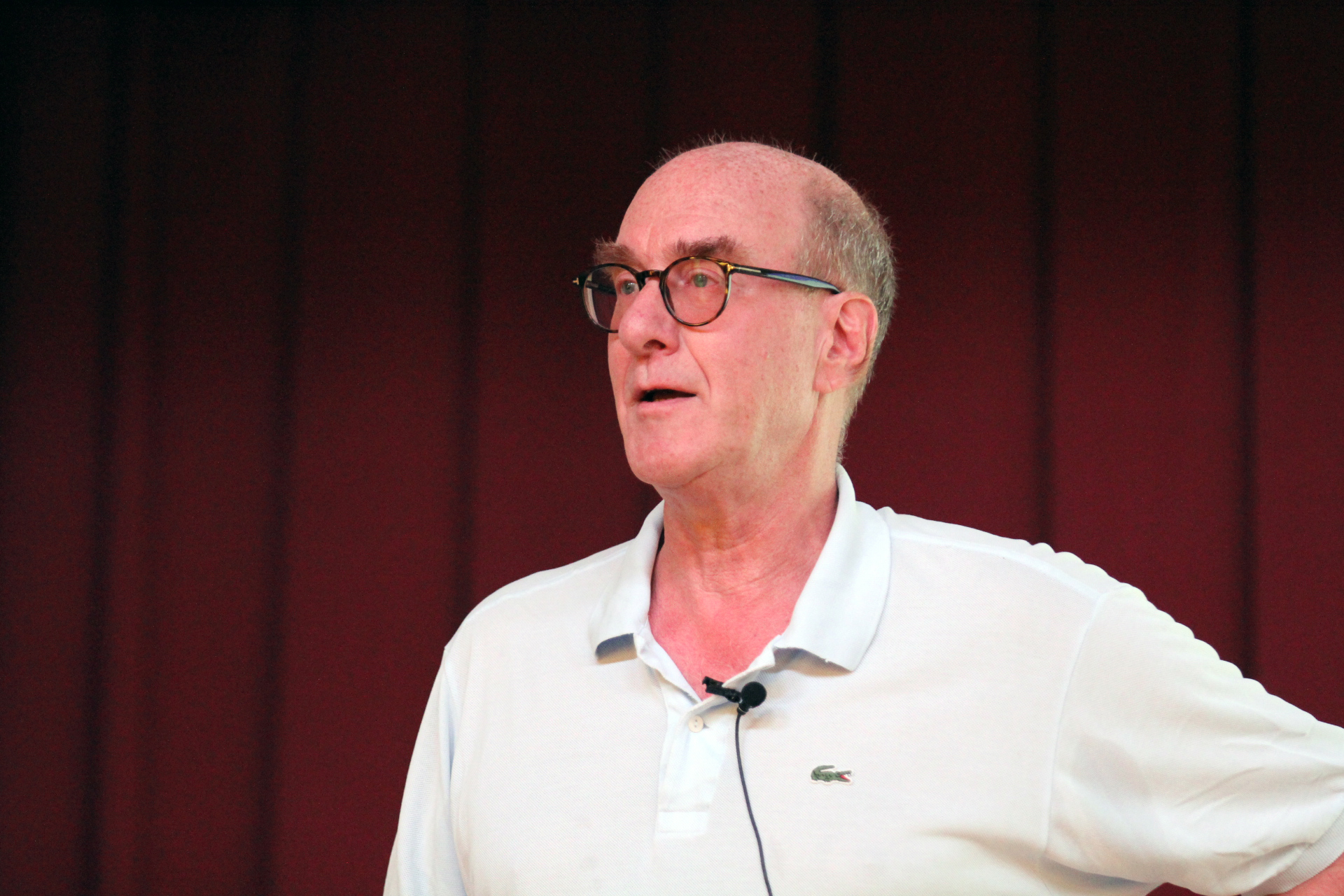
- Lüst in 2023
- Born: September 21, 1956 (age 70); Chicago
- Education: LMU Munich, Technical University of Munich
- Known for: S-duality
- Parents: Reimar Lüst (father); Rhea Lüst (mother)
- Scientific career
- Fields: String theory, gauge theory, gravity
- Workplaces: CERN, Humboldt University of Berlin, LMU Munich
- Thesis: Dynamische Massenerzeugung für Quarks und Leptonen (1985)
- Doctoral advisor: Harald Fritzsch
- Website: Homepage at LMU Munich

Dieter Lüst (born 21 September 1956 in Chicago) is a German physicist, full professor for mathematical physics at LMU Munich since 2004 and a director of the Max Planck Institute for Physics in Munich. His research focuses on string theory. In 2000, he received the Gottfried Wilhelm Leibniz Prize of the Deutsche Forschungsgemeinschaft, which is the highest honour awarded in German research.

== Education ==
Dieter's parents, Reimar Lüst and Rhea Lüst, were also physicists. He studied physics from 1976 to 1982 at the Technical University of Munich before receiving a doctorate from LMU Munich in 1985 and habilitation was completed in 1990.

== Career ==
Lüst performed his postgrad work at the California Institute of Technology and Max Planck Institute for Physics. He was a Fellow at the European Organization for Nuclear Research (CERN) in Geneva between 1988 and 1990, and was there again with a Heisenberg fellowship in 1990/93. In 1993, he took up a chair in quantum field theory at the Humboldt University of Berlin. He has been an external scientific member of the Max Planck Institute for Gravitational Physics in Golm.

With Anamaría Font, Luis E. Ibáñez, and Fernando Quevedo they proposed a weak-strong duality conjecture which introduced the concept of S-duality in 1990.

He has been an editor of Fortschritte der Physik and a co-editor of Journal of High Energy Physics.

== Awards ==
- 2000: Gottfried Wilhelm Leibniz Prize
- 2000: Member of the Berlin-Brandenburg Academy of Sciences and Humanities
- 2005: Gay-Lussac-Humboldt-Prize
