= Transandean Highway =

Road in Venezuela

Transandean Highway

Route information
- Length: 1,539 km (956 mi)
- Existed: July 24, 1925–present

Location
- Country: Venezuela

Highway system
- Highways in Venezuela

The Trans-Andean Highway (official designation Troncal 7, official name Carretera Trasandina), was inaugurated on July 24, 1925. It is 1,539 km long. It runs through the Venezuelan states of Mérida, Trujillo and Táchira, from the proximities of Agua Viva up until San Cristóbal. Its highest point is located on Collado del Cóndor, at 4,118 meters (13,510 ft), making it the highest highway in Venezuela.

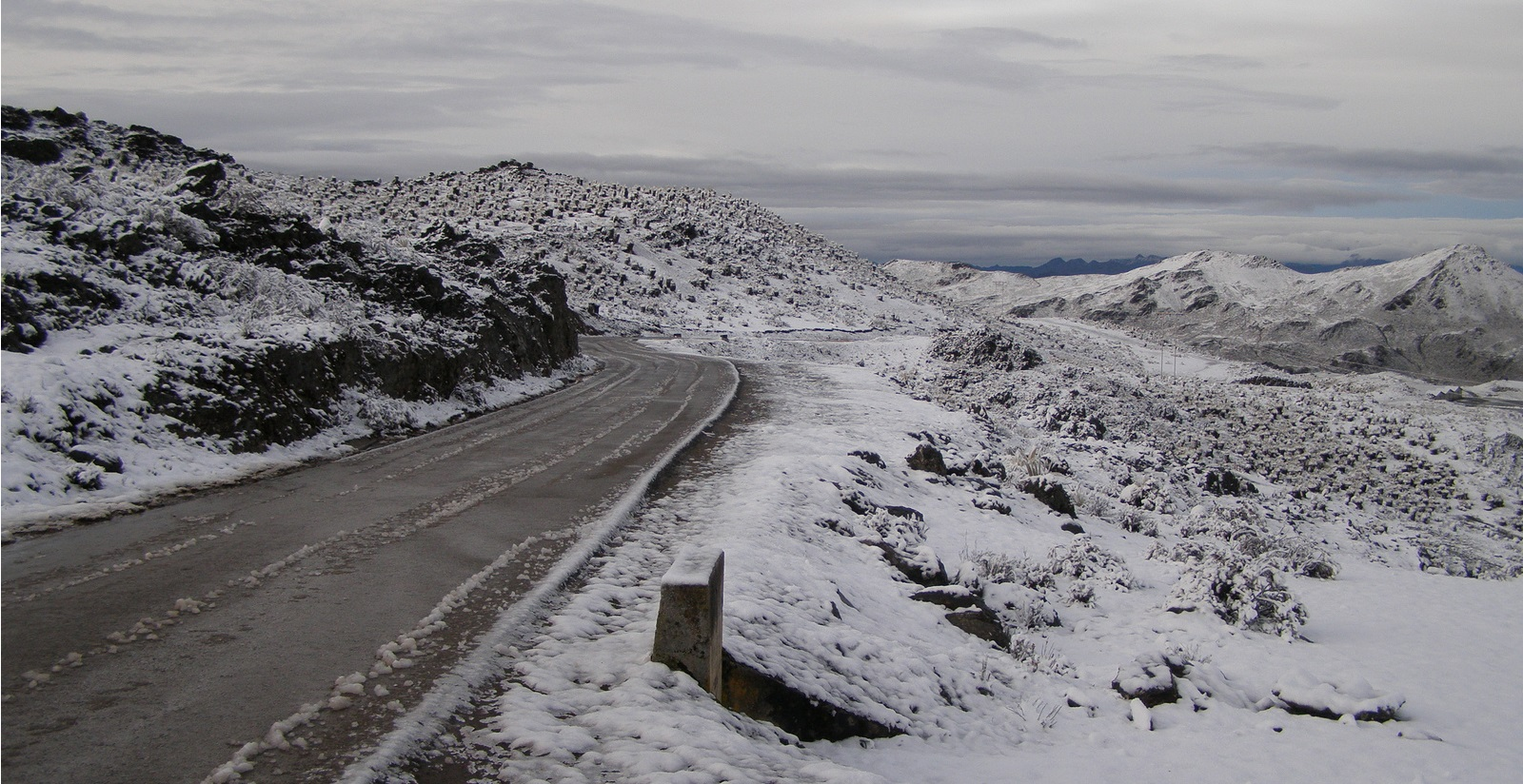
Collado del Cóndor, highest point in Trans-andean highway.

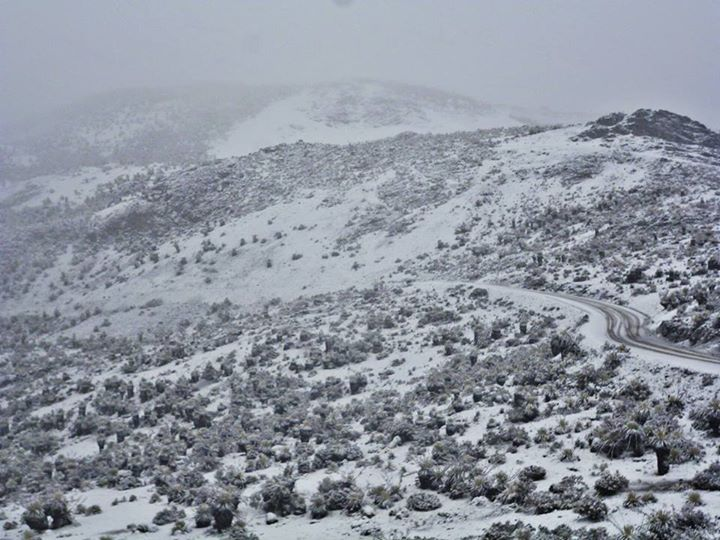
View of a snowfall on Trans-Andean Highway.

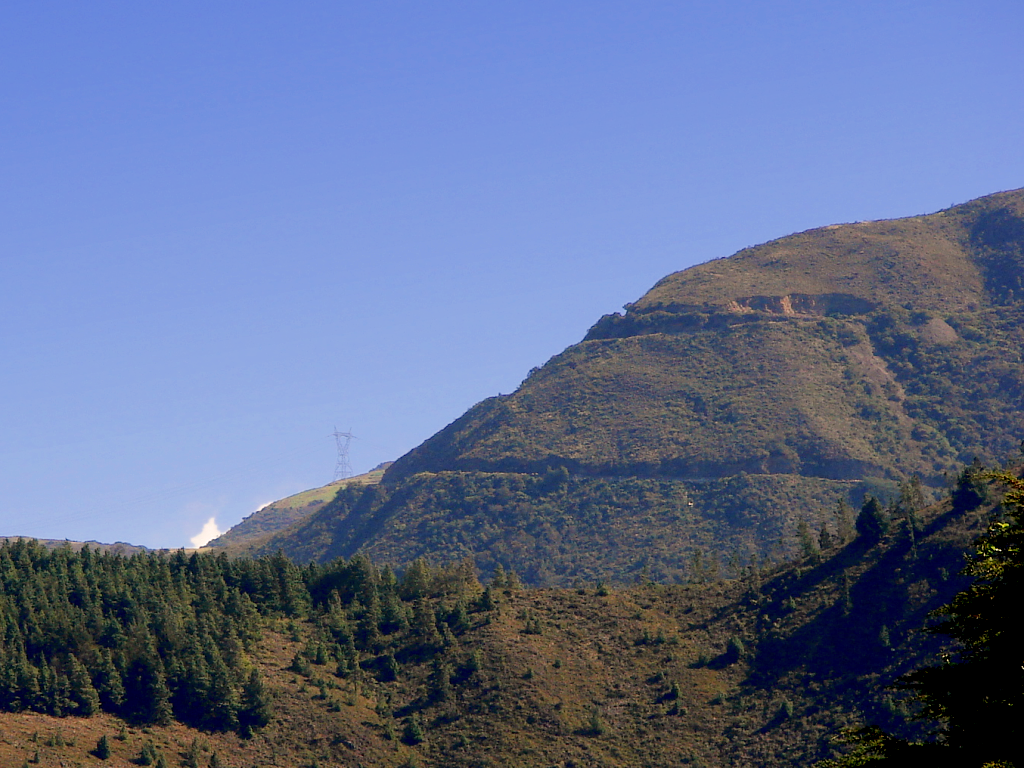
Most of its route has beautiful scenic views.

== History ==
The highway was built as part of the national road plan passed by the government of former President Juan Vicente Gómez. A significant number of prisoners were involved in its construction. The road had a big impact because for the first time it connected the Andean states of Venezuela with the rest of the country and facilitated, among other things, the ability of military forces to deal with rebellions which affected the area.

Altitudinal profile of Transandean Highway
