= Pico El Águila =

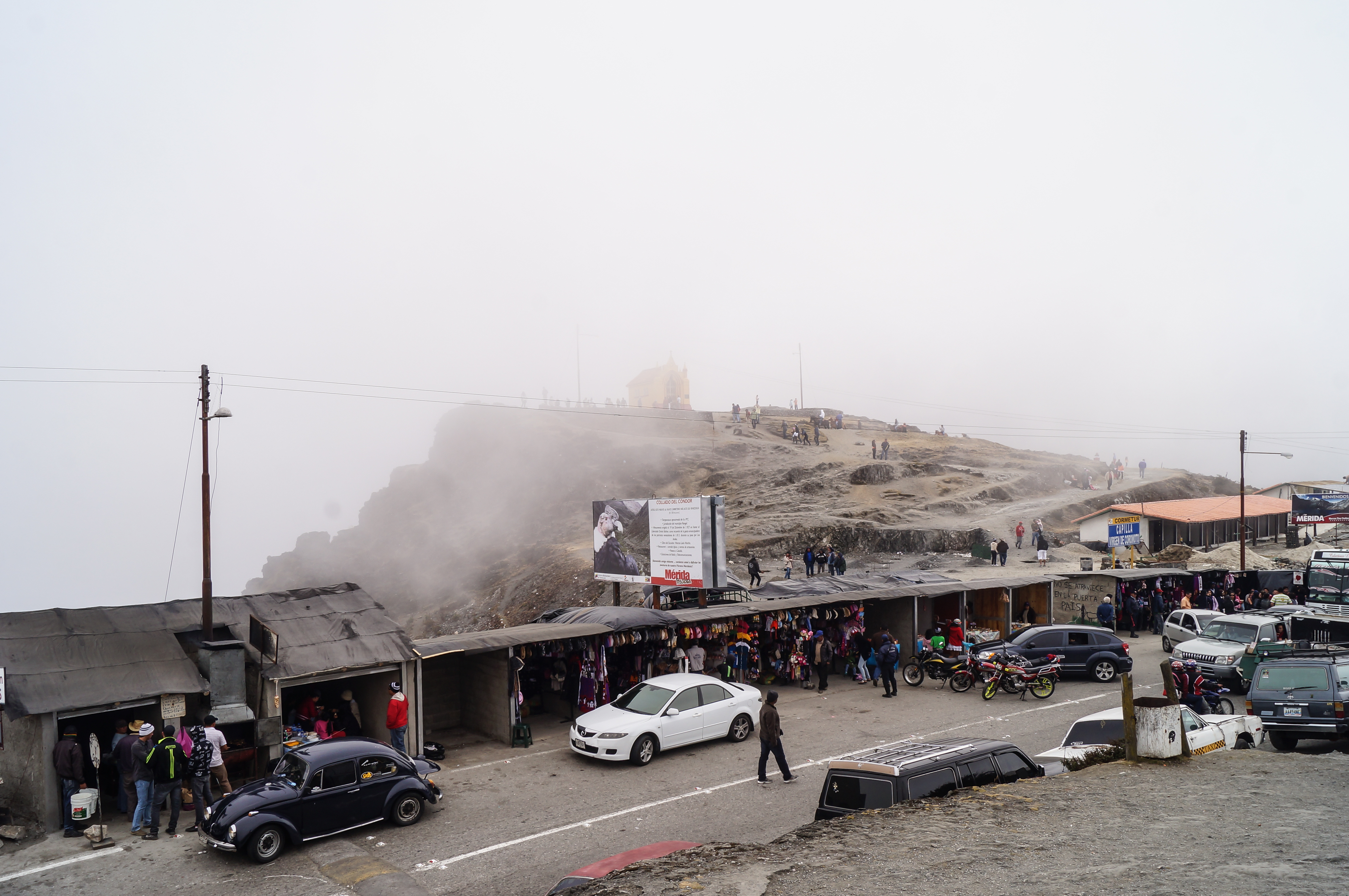

Highest point
- Elevation: 4,118 m (13,510 ft)
- Coordinates: 8°51′00″N 70°49′00″W

Geography
- Location within Venezuela
- Location: Mérida, Mérida State, Venezuela
- Parent range: Sierra Nevada de Mérida (part of the Andes)

Climbing
- Easiest route: Drive

Pico El Águila or Collado del Cóndor is the milestone that stands at the highest elevation on the Venezuelan Transandean Highway (a branch of the Pan-American Highway) in the Cordillera de Mérida of Venezuela. Nearby stands a monument, sculpted by a Colombian artist, Marcos León Mariño, depicting a condor, commemorating an event in the campaign of El Libertador, Simón Bolivar. It is located in the state of Mérida and has an altitude of 4,118 meters.

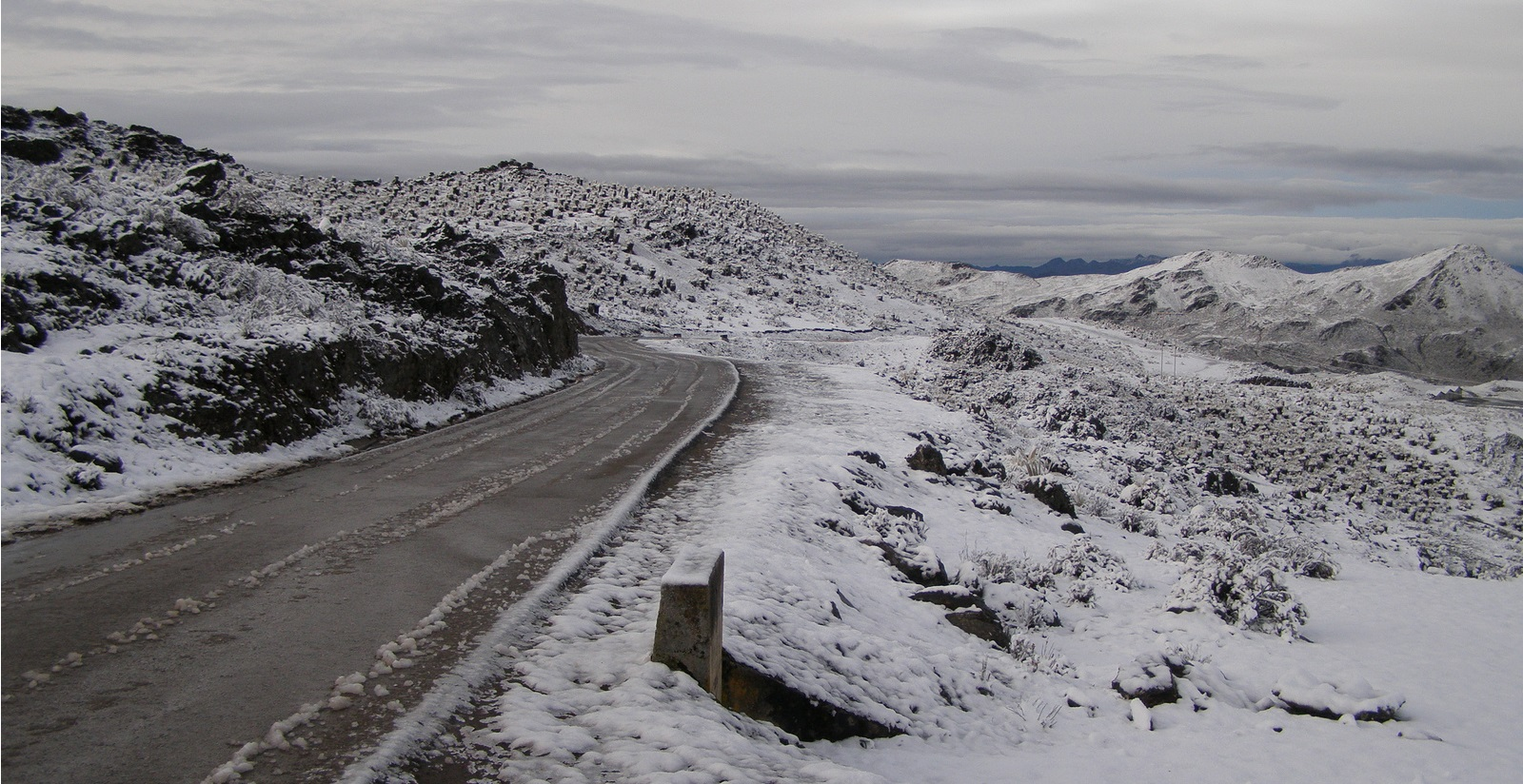
Collado del Cóndor, the highest point in the Transandean highway.

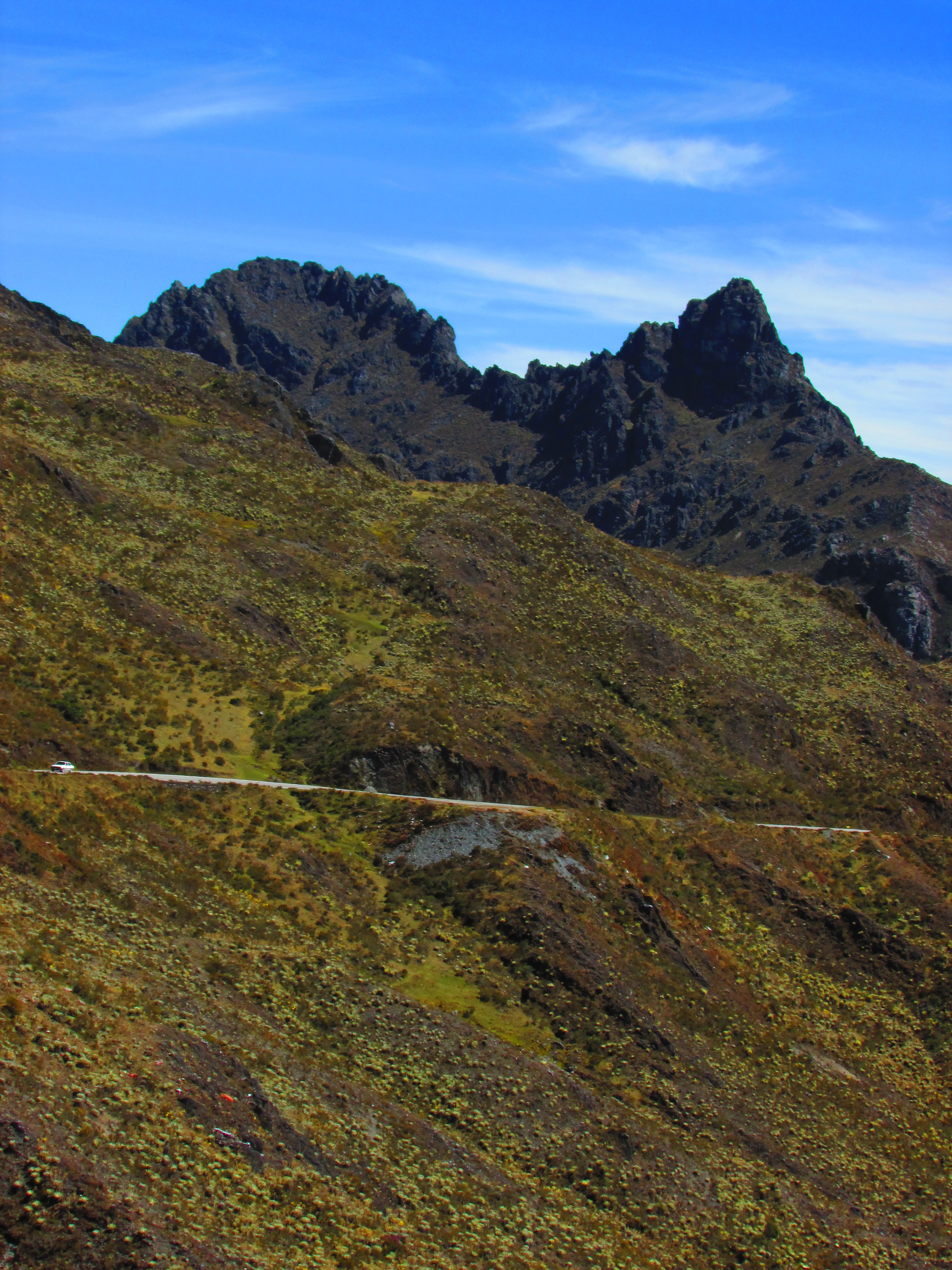

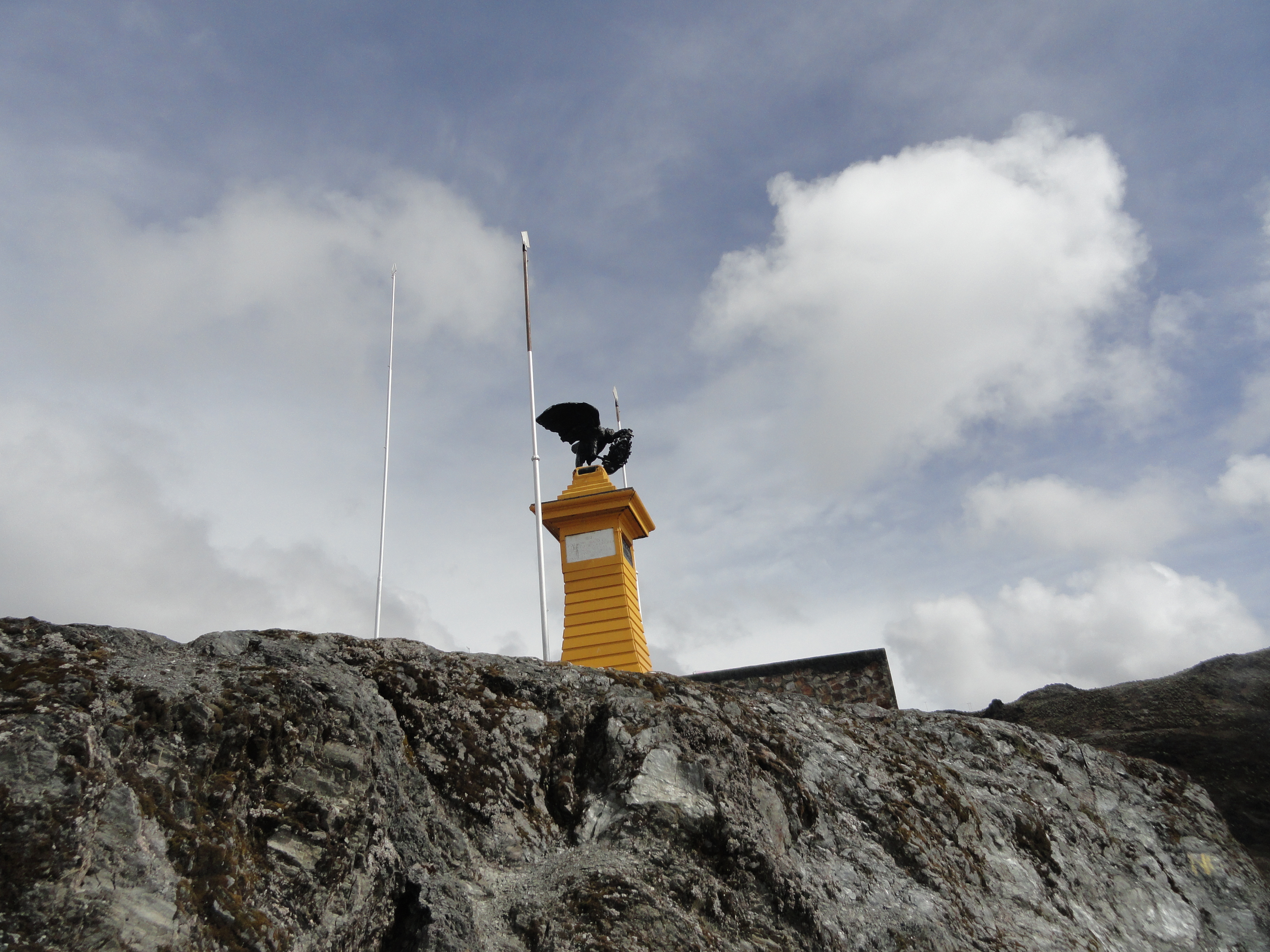

== See also ==
- List of mountains in the Andes
