= Centro de Investigaciones de Astronomia =

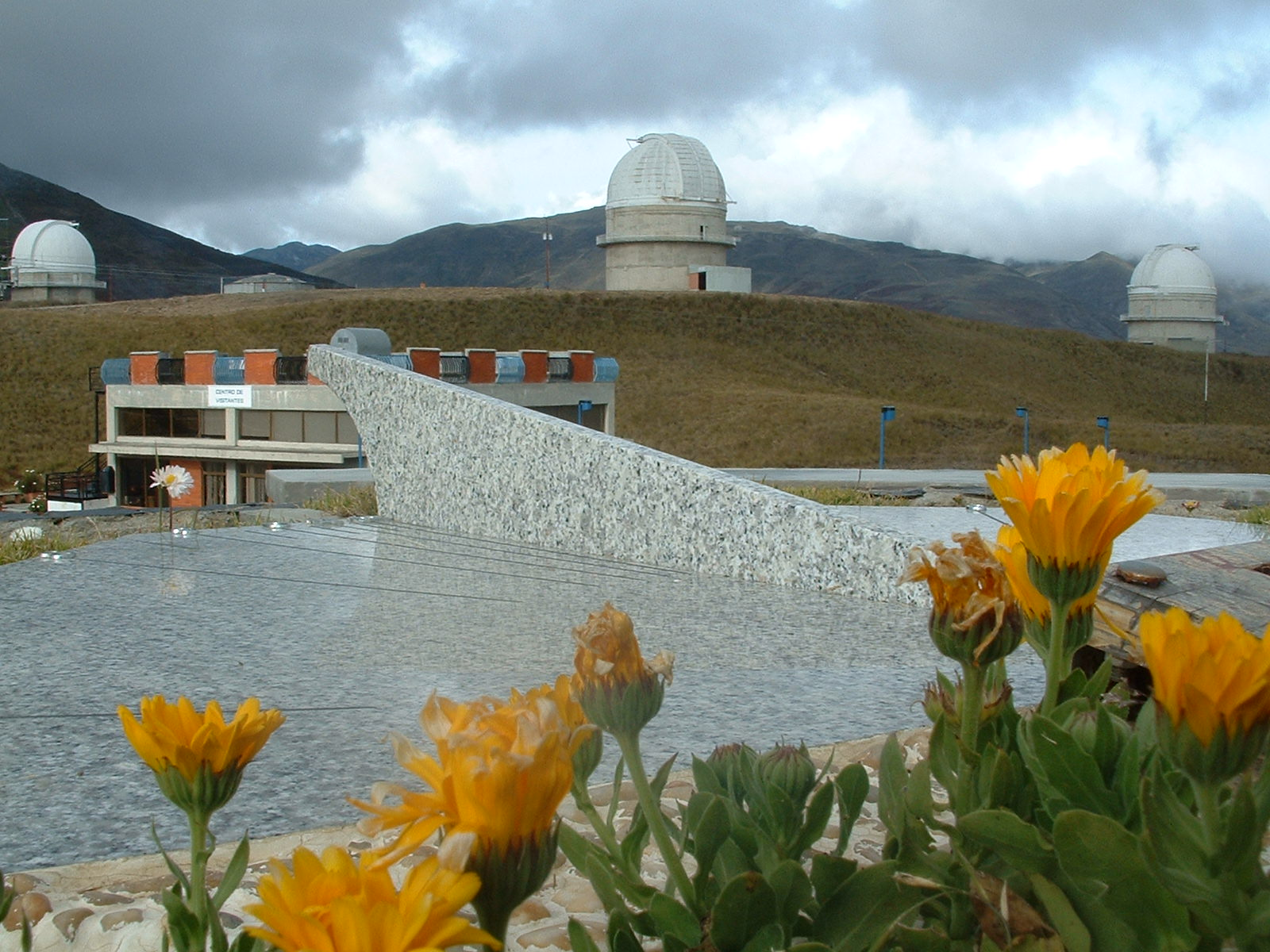
A sundial at the National Observatory of Llano del Hato (Venezuela).

The Centro de Investigaciones de Astronomía (CIDA) is an institution in Venezuela, founded in honour of Francisco J. Duarte in 1975 for promoting observation, investigation, experimentation, theoretical work, and dissemination of research in the field of astronomy. It runs the Llano del Hato National Astronomical Observatory and is one of the collaborators in QUEST.

== See also ==
- List of astronomical societies
