= Modular tensor category =

Type of monoidal category

A modular tensor category (or modular fusion category) is a type of monoidal category that plays a role in the areas of topological quantum field theory, conformal field theory, and quantum algebra. Modular tensor categories were introduced in 1989 by the physicists Greg Moore and Nathan Seiberg in the context of rational conformal field theory. In the context of quantum field theory, modular tensor categories are used to store algebraic data for rational conformal field theories in 2 dimensional spacetime, and topological quantum field theories in 3 dimensional spacetime. In the context of condensed matter physics, modular tensor categories play a role in the algebraic theory of topological quantum information, as they are used to store the algebraic data describing anyons in topological quantum phases of matter.

Mathematically, a modular tensor category is a rigid, semisimple, braided fusion category with a non-degenerate braiding, ensuring a well-defined notion of topological invariance. These categories naturally arise in quantum groups, representation theory, and low-dimensional topology, where they are used to construct knot and three-manifold invariants.

== Description ==
The term 'modular tensor category' was coined by Igor Frenkel in 1989. The interpretation in terms of category theory was introduced by Vladimir Turaev in 1992. His definition, however, is slightly more general than the modern definition, in the sense that it does not require the category to have every object as a direct sum of finitely many simple objects. The word 'modular' refers to the fact that every modular tensor category has an associated modular group representation. The word 'tensor' refers to the fact that modular tensor categories were originally not defined as abstract categories, but were instead defined in terms of a compatible collection of tensors.

There are several equivalent alternative ways of defining modular tensor categories. One definition is as follows: a modular tensor category is a braided spherical fusion category with non-degenerate braiding. In the presence of a braiding, Deligne's twisting lemma states that a spherical structure is equivalent to a ribbon structure, so modular tensor categories can be equivalently defined as non-degenerate ribbon fusion categories. The Bruguières modularity theorem asserts that a braided spherical fusion category has non-degenerate braiding if and only if its modular S-matrix is non-degenerate (invertible). Thus, a modular tensor category can be equivalently defined as a braided spherical fusion category with non-degenerate S-matrix. Modular tensor categories can also be defined using skeletonization.

There are several theorems about modular tensor categories, such as the existence of the modular group representation, the Bruguières modularity theorem, the Verlinde formula, the rank-finiteness theorem, the Schauenburg-Ng theorem, and Müger's theorem.

== Definition ==
A modular tensor category $\mathcal{C}$ consists of the following pieces of data:

1. A $\mathbb{C}$-linear category $\mathcal{C}$. That is, a category $\mathcal{C}$ enriched over the category ${\bf Vec}_\mathbb{C}$ of complex vector spaces.
2. The structure of a monoidal category on $\mathcal{C}$.
3. The structure of a right rigid category on $\mathcal{C}$.
4. The structure of a braiding on $\mathcal{C}$.
5. A pivotal structure on $\mathcal{C}$. That is, a monoidal natural isomorphism $i: \text{id}_{\mathcal{C}}\to (\text{id}_{\mathcal{C}})^{**}$.

To form a modular tensor category, the pieces of data are required to satisfy the following axioms:

1. There is an equivalence $\mathcal{C}\simeq {\bf Vec}_{\mathbb{C}}^n$ of $\mathbb{C}$-linear categories for some natural number $n\geq 1$.
2. The monoidal structure $\otimes: \mathcal{C}\times\mathcal{C}\to\mathcal{C}$ is a $\mathbb{C}$-linear functor.
3. There is an isomorphism $\text{End}_{\mathcal{C}}({\bf 1})\cong \mathbb{C}$ of vector spaces, where ${\bf 1}$ is the tensor unit of $\mathcal{C}$.
4. (Spherical axiom) Given an object $A\in \mathcal{C}$, the evaluation and coevaluation maps from its rigid structure are denoted by $\text{ev}_{A}:A^*\otimes A\to {\bf 1}$ and $\text{coev}_{A}:{\bf 1}\to A\otimes A^*$. For all morphisms $f:A\to A$, there is an equality of maps

$$\text{ev}_{A^*}\circ (i_A\otimes \text{id}_{A^*})(f\otimes \text{id}_{A^*})\circ \text{coev}_{A} = \text{ev}_{A^*}\circ (\text{id}_{A^*}\otimes f)(\text{id}_A\otimes i_A^{-1})\circ \text{coev}_{A^*}.$$
5. (Non-degeneracy) Let $\beta$ denote the braiding on $\mathcal{C}$. For all objects $A\in \mathcal{C}$, if $\beta_{B,A}\circ \beta_{A,B}=\text{id}_{A\otimes B}$ for every $B\in\mathcal{C}$, then there exists some natural number $n\geq 0$ such that $A\cong n\cdot {\bf 1}$.

These axioms are motivated physically as follows:

- The $\mathbb{C}$-linear structure reflects the fact that modular tensor categories are supposed to model quantum mechanical phenomena.
- The monoidal structure is supposed to represent a fusion process, whereby two objects in $\mathcal{C}$ are brought together to create a new object in $\mathcal{C}$. In the context of anyons, this corresponds to moving two anyons close together so that they form a joint excitation.
- The braiding structure is supposed to represent a physical braiding process, whereby adjacent objects can be braided around one another. In the context of anyons, this corresponds to moving one anyon around the other by some string operators.
- The dual objects in the rigid structure are supposed to represent antiparticles, with the evaluation and co-evaluation maps corresponding to pair creation and annihilation operators. In the context of anyons, this corresponds to the ability to create and annihilate pairs of anyons with opposite topological charge.
- The pivotal structure and the spherical axiom encode natural compatibility conditions between particles and antiparticles that are expected on physical grounds.
- The equivalence $\mathcal{C}\simeq {\bf Vec}_{\mathbb{C}}^n$ reflects some finer nature of the correspondence between objects in modular tensor categories and physical phenomena. Roughly, it corresponds to the fact that the quasiparticles described by $\mathcal{C}$ have finitely many distinct types (superselection sectors) and that every quasiparticle can be broken down via measurements to elementary quasiparticles (a sort of physical semi-simplicity). In the context of anyons, this corresponds to the fact that individual topological phases of matter can only support finitely many anyon types and that topological charge measurement can project any localized excitation into an elementary anyon.

=== Relationship to other notions ===
There are various intermediate notions which can be defined using only a subset of the structures and axioms of a modular tensor category.

- A category with structure (1) and axiom (1) from above is called a (Kapranov–Voevodsky) 2-vector space. Often, instead of being defined through an abstract equivalence $\mathcal{C}\simeq {\bf Vec}_{\mathbb{C}}^n$, 2-vector spaces are defined in a piecemeal fashion. That is, a $\mathbb{C}$-linear category $\mathcal{C}$ is a 2-vector space if and only if it is abelian, semisimple, and has finitely many isomorphism classes of simple objects.
- A category with structures (1) + (2) + (3) and satisfying axioms (1) + (2) + (3) is called a fusion category.
- A category with all of the structures of a modular tensor category satisfying all of the axioms but non-degeneracy (that is, a braided spherical fusion category) is called a pre-modular category.

== Relationship to topological quantum field theory ==
The relationship between modular tensor categories and topological quantum field theory is codified in the Reshetikhin–Turaev construction, which was introduced in 1991 by Vladimir Turaev and Nicolai Reshetikhin. This construction was introduced to serve as a mathematical realization of Edward Witten's proposal of defining invariants of links and 3-manifolds using quantum field theory. The Reshetikhin-Turaev construction assigns to every modular tensor category a (2+1)-dimensional topological quantum field theory. In one interpretation of the theory, the Reshetikhin-Turaev construction induces a bijection between once-extended anomalous (2+1)-dimensional topological quantum field theories valued in the 2-category of $\mathbb{C}$-linear categories, and modular multi-tensor categories equipped with a square root of the global dimension in each factor. Here, a modular multi-tensor category refers to a modular tensor category with the possibility that $\text{End}_{\mathcal{C}}({\bf 1})\not\simeq \mathbb{C}$.

== Relationship to rational conformal field theory ==
The relationship between modular tensor categories and rational conformal field theory was introduced by Greg Moore and Nathan Seiberg. After a series of papers studying the algebraic relations between the basic chiral pieces of data in rational conformal field theories (primary fields), Moore and Seiberg discovered that the structure into which these pieces of data naturally assemble is a modular tensor category. This data is now referred to as the Moore-Seiberg data of a rational conformal field theory. This data is not entirely enough to specify a conformal field theory; in particular, some non-chiral data is needed to arrive at a full theory with local correlation functions. This additional necessary data was studied by Jürgen Fuchs, Ingo Runkel, and Christoph Schweigert, corresponds to the data of a symmetric special Frobenius algebra object in the Moore-Seiberg modular tensor category.

The connection between rational conformal field theory and modular tensor categories can also be understood in the language of vertex operator algebras. There is a well-established theory that associates to every conformal field theory a vertex operator algebra. When this vertex operator algebra is rational and satisfies certain algebraic conditions, its category of representations is naturally equipped with the structure of a modular tensor category.

== Constructions of modular tensor categories ==
There are various constructions of modular tensor categories from across the mathematical and physical literature.

=== From finite groups ===
One construction comes from finite group theory. This construction assigns to every finite group $G$ a modular tensor category $\mathcal{D}(G)$ referred to as the quantum double of $G$. This category is defined as the Drinfeld center of the category of (complex) representations of $G$. That is, $\mathcal{D}(G)=\mathcal{Z}(\textrm{Rep}_G)$. Alternatively, $\mathcal{D}(G)$ can be defined as the Drinfeld center of the category of $G$-graded (complex) vector spaces. That is, $\mathcal{D}(G)=\mathcal{Z}(\textrm{Vec}_G)$. It is a non-trivial fact that these two definitions are equivalent, which is referred to as a categorical Morita equivalence between $\mathrm{Rep}_G$ and $\mathrm{Vec}_G$. In this context, two monoidal categories are called Morita equivalent if there is an equivalence of braided monoidal categories between their Drinfeld centers.

There is a more general construction that comes from twisting the associativity relation by a 3-cocycle in group cohomology $H^3 (G,U(1))$, where $U(1)$ is the circle group. More precisely, given any 3-cochain $\alpha\in Z^3 (G,U(1))$ there is an associated spherical fusion category ${\text{Vec}}_{G}^{\alpha}$ which is defined identically to the category of $G$-graded vector spaces $\mathrm{Vec}_G$ except that its associativity relation is twisted by $\alpha$. Cochains which differ by a coboundary yield equivalent spherical fusion categories, so the spherical fusion category ${\text{Vec}}_{G}^{\alpha}$ is well-defined up to equivalence on cohomology classes in $H^3 (G,U(1))$. Taking the Drinfeld center $\mathcal{Z}(\text{Vec}_{G}^{\alpha})$ results in a modular tensor category which is determined by a finite group $G$ and a cohomology class $[\alpha]\in H^3(G,U(1))$.

On the level of topological quantum field theory, the group-theoretical modular tensor category $\mathcal{D}(G)$ correspond to discrete gauge theory with finite gauge group $G$, also called Dijkgraaf-Witten theory, named after Robbert Dijkgraaf and Edward Witten. The 3-cocycle $[\alpha]\in H^3(G,U(1))$ corresponds to a choice of Dijkgraaf-Witten action in the Lagrangian. On the level topological order, $\mathcal{D}(G)$ corresponds to the anyons in Kitaev's quantum double model with input group $G$.

=== From quantum groups ===
Associated to every compact, simple, simply-connected Lie group $G$ with associated Lie algebra $\mathfrak{g}$ and every positive integer $k\geq 1$, there is an associated quantum group $\mathcal{U}_q(\mathfrak{g})$ where $q$ is a certain root of unity associated to $k$ via the formula $q=e^{\pi i / D(k+ \check{h})}$ where $\check{h}$ is the dual Coxeter number of $\mathfrak{g}$ and $D$ is the biggest absolute value of an off-diagonal entry of the Cartan matrix of $\mathfrak{g}$. From this quantum group it is possible to define a category called the $\mathcal{C}({{\mathfrak g}},k)$, which is defined by performing a certain semi-simplification procedure on the category of representations of $\mathcal{U}_q(\mathfrak{g})$. For choices of $\mathfrak{g}$, $k$ not lying is certain exceptional families, the category $\mathcal{C}({{\mathfrak g}},k)$ is modular and is called the quantum group modular category of $\mathfrak{g}$ at level $k$.

On the level of topological quantum field theory, quantum group modular categories correspond to Chern–Simons theory. Chern-Simons theories are specified by a compact simple Lie group $G$, which corresponds to the gauge group of the theory, and an integer level $k\geq 1$ which specifies a coupling constant in the Chern-Simons action. The modular tensor category corresponding to the $(G,k)$ Chern-Simons theory under the Reshetikhin-Turaev construction is $\mathcal{C}({{\mathfrak g}},k)$. It was on the physical grounds of Chern-Simons theory that Edward Witten theorized that every compact, simple Lie group and integer level should be associated to invariants of links and 3-manifolds, and it is using the Reshetikhin-Turaev construction associated to $\mathcal{C}({{\mathfrak g}},k)$ that Witten's program was completed.

=== From weak Hopf algebras ===
There is a construction of modular tensor categories coming from the theory of weak Hopf algebras. These constructions play on the general theme of Tannaka–Krein duality. It can be shown that the representation category of every finite-dimensional Weak Hopf algebra is a $\mathbb{C}$-linear monoidal category, which is equivalent as a $\mathbb{C}$-linear category to $\textrm{Vec}_{\mathbb{C}}^n$. It is a theorem of Takahiro Hayashi that the converse is also true - every $\mathbb{C}$-linear monoidal category, which is equivalent as a $\mathbb{C}$-linear category to $\textrm{Vec}_{\mathbb{C}}^n$ is equivalent to the representation category of some weak Hopf algebra. Adding more structures onto the weak Hopf algebras corresponds to adding more structures on the representation category. For instance, adding a quasitriangular structure to the weak Hopf algebra corresponds to adding a braiding on the representation category. In their original work, Reshetikhin-Turaev introduced the notion of a modular Hopf algebra, which has sufficiently many structures and axioms so that its representation category will be a modular category. In the context of Hopf algebras, it is common to work with the quantum double construction which is defined by taking in an input weak Hopf algebra $H$ and outputting the doubled Hopf algebra $H\otimes H^*$ which can naturally be equipped with a quasi-triangular structure, and whose representation category will often be a modular tensor category. These sorts of modular Hopf algebras are called 'doubled'. On the level of topological order, the representation categories doubled Hopf algebras correspond to anyons in the generalized Kitaev quantum double model.

=== From subfactors ===
There are relationships between modular tensor categories and subfactors introduced and developed throughout the late 1990s and early 2000s by Adrian Ocneanu, Michael Müger, and other authors. These constructions typically work by first constructing a spherical fusion category and then taking its Drinfeld center, which is modular by Müger's theorem. There are various relevant constructions, depending on the type of the subfactor and the axioms it is required to satisfy. For example, in the case of a type ${\rm II}_1$subfactor $N\subset M$ with finite index and finite depth, the associated spherical fusion category is defined by taking by considering the sub-category of $N$-$N$ bimodules generated by $M$, viewed as an $N$-$N$ bimodule. In the case of separable type ${\rm III}_1$factors $M$, there is an associated spherical fusion category ${\textrm{End}}(M)$ whose objects are $*$-automorphisms of $M$ and whose morphisms are intertwining maps. Any finite-index subfactor $N\subset M$ naturally gives rise to the structure of a Frobenius algebra in ${\textrm{End}}(M)$, and in fact there is a bijection between finite-index subfactors of $M$ and Frobenius algebras in ${\textrm{End}}(M)$.

Using the Reshetikhin-Turaev construction, all of these constructions of modular tensor categories can assigned topological quantum field theories. In the case of type ${\rm II}_1$subfactors $N\subset M$ with finite index and finite depth, there is an alternative approach due to Ocneanu which directly constructs the relevant field theory.

== See also ==
- Algebraic theory of topological quantum information
- Modular group representation
- Skeletonization of fusion categories
- Rank-finiteness for fusion categories
