= Müger's theorem =

In mathematics, Müger's theorem asserts that the Drinfeld center of every spherical fusion category is a modular tensor category. Müger's theorem was introduced in 2003 by mathematician Michael Müger. Due to the connections between spherical fusion categories and modular tensor categories to the algebraic theory of topological quantum information, this theorem has found various uses within mathematical physics.

== Interpretation in terms of topological quantum field theory ==
In terms of topological quantum field theory, Müger's theorem is useful for understanding the relationship between the Turaev–Viro construction and the Reshetikhin–Turaev construction. The Reshetikhin–Turaev construction takes as input a modular tensor category and has as output a (2+1)-dimensional topological quantum field theory. The Turaev–Viro construction takes as input a spherical fusion category and has as output a (2+1)-dimensional topological quantum field theory. The relationship between these models is that the Turaev–Viro model with input spherical fusion category $\mathcal{C}$ is equivalent to the Reshetikhin-Turaev model with input modular tensor category $\mathcal{Z}(\mathcal{C})$. For this to be a valid equivalence, it is necessary for the Drinfeld center of a spherical fusion category to be a modular tensor category.

== Interpretation in terms of the Levin–Wen model ==
In terms of lattice model, Müger's theorem is useful for understanding the Levin–Wen model. In condensed matter physics, the Levin–Wen model is a construction which takes as input a unitary fusion category $\mathcal{C}$ and has as output an exactly solvable lattice model for topological order whose anyons are described by the category $\mathcal{Z}(\mathcal{C})$. For $\mathcal{Z}(\mathcal{C})$ to be a valid description of anyons in a physical system, the algebraic theory of topological quantum information asserts that $\mathcal{Z}(\mathcal{C})$ would need to be a unitary modular tensor category.

Every unitary fusion category $\mathcal{C}$ admits a canonical spherical structure. As such, Müger's theorem applies and asserts that $\mathcal{Z}(\mathcal{C})$ is a modular tensor category, and the unitary structure on $\mathcal{C}$ endows $\mathcal{Z}(\mathcal{C})$ with the structure of a unitary modular tensor category. Thus, in this context, Müger's theorem encodes the fact that for any unitary fusion category $\mathcal{C}$ the quantum double $\mathcal{Z}(\mathcal{C})$ is a valid choice of anyon theory for the Levin–Wen model.
