= Skeletonization of fusion categories =

Categorical procedure

In mathematics, the skeletonization of fusion categories is a process whereby one extracts the core data of a fusion category or related categorical object in terms of minimal set-theoretic information. This set-theoretic information is referred to as the skeletal data of the fusion category. This process is related to the general technique of skeletonization in category theory. Skeletonization is often used for working with examples, doing computations, and classifying fusion categories.

The relevant feature of fusion categories which makes the technique of skeletonization effective is the strong finiteness conditions placed on fusion categories, such as the requirements that they have finitely many isomorphism classes of simple objects and that all of their hom-spaces are finite dimensional. This allows the entire categorical structure of a fusion category to be encoded in a finite amount of complex numbers, arranged into tensors. The coherence conditions on fusion categories turn into compatibility conditions on the tensors.

In this context, skeletonization is the opposite process of categorification, which takes set-theoretic information and turns it into category-theoretic data.

== For fusion categories ==
The skeletonization of fusion categories is often stated in terms of string diagrams. In this approach, morphims in the category are depicted as strings, which one can interpret as spacetime trajectories of some point-like objects.

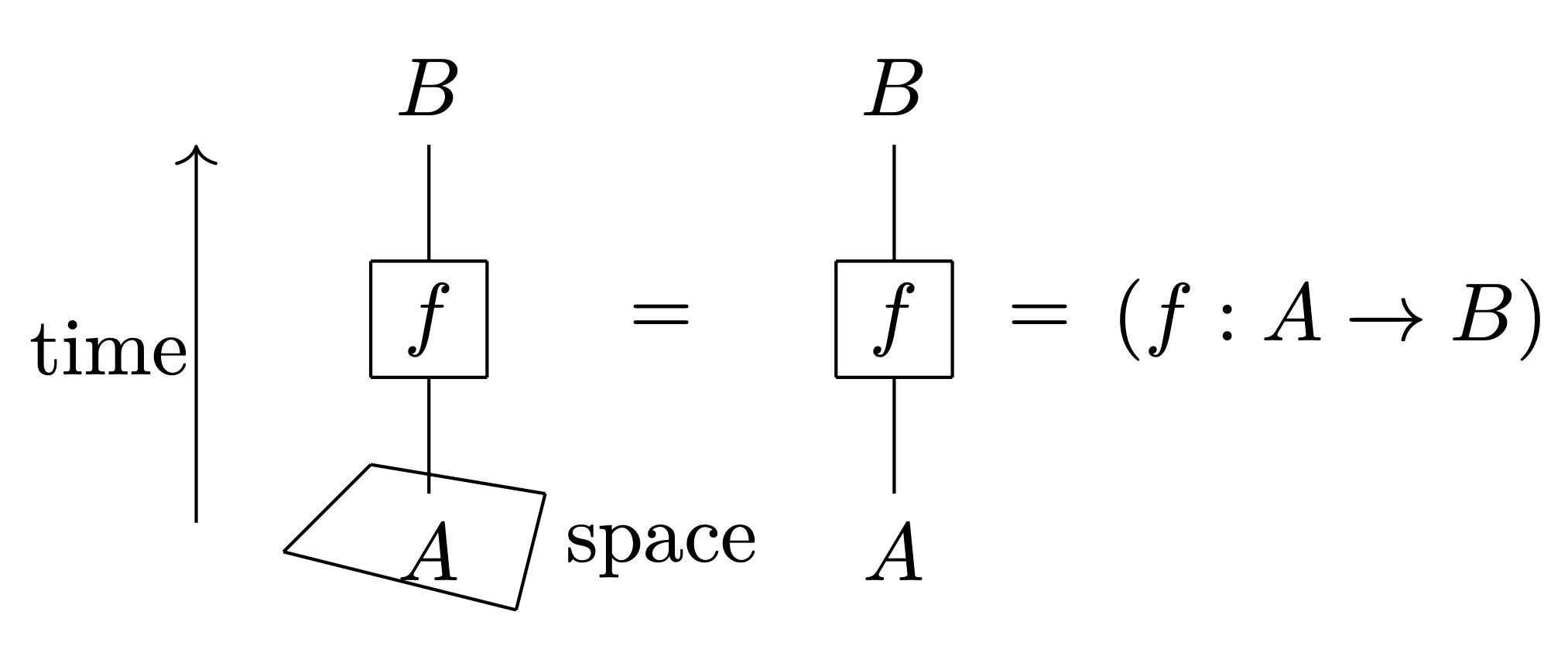
Relationship between abstract string diagrams and morphisms.

The tensor product is denoted by placing strings adjacent to one another.

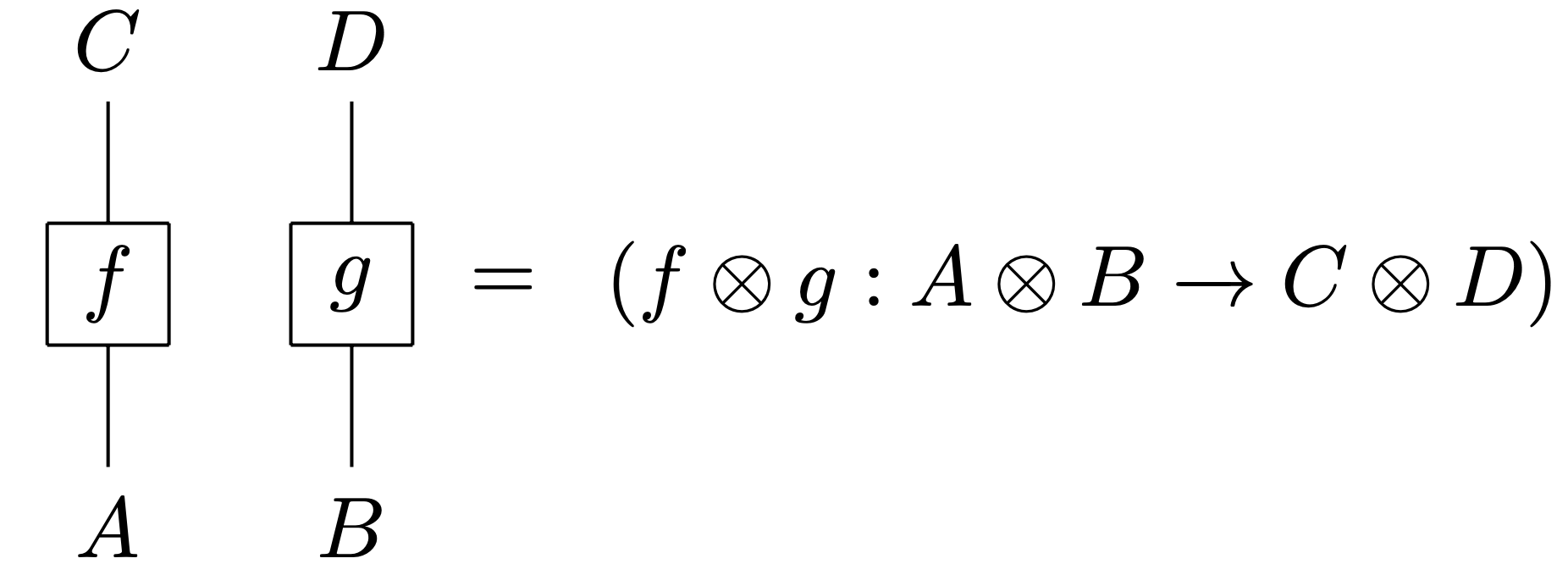
The tensor product of two morphisms in terms of string diagrams.

Let $\mathcal{C}$ denote a fusion category. Let $\mathcal{L}$ denote the set of isomorphism classes of simple objects of $\mathcal{C}$. By the definition of a fusion category, $\mathcal{L}$ is a finite set and contains a distinguished element $[{\bf 1}]$ corresponding to the tensor unit. Since fusion categories are semi-simple, for all $[A], [B] \in \mathcal{L}$, there is a decomposition $A\otimes B\cong \bigoplus_{[C]\in \mathcal{L}}N^{A,B}_{C}\cdot C$. Here, the coefficient $N^{A,B}_{C}$ describes with which multiplicity $C$ occurs in the tensor product of $A$ and $B$. These coefficients $N^{A,B}_{C}$ are non-negative integers which only depend on the isomorphism classes of $A,B,C\in\mathcal{C}$, and are referred to as the fusion coefficients of $\mathcal{C}$, and are the first basic piece of the skeletal data of $\mathcal{C}$.

Given simple objects $A,B,C\in\mathcal{C}$, any morphisms $\eta:C\to A\otimes B$ can be depicted using string diagrams notion as follows.

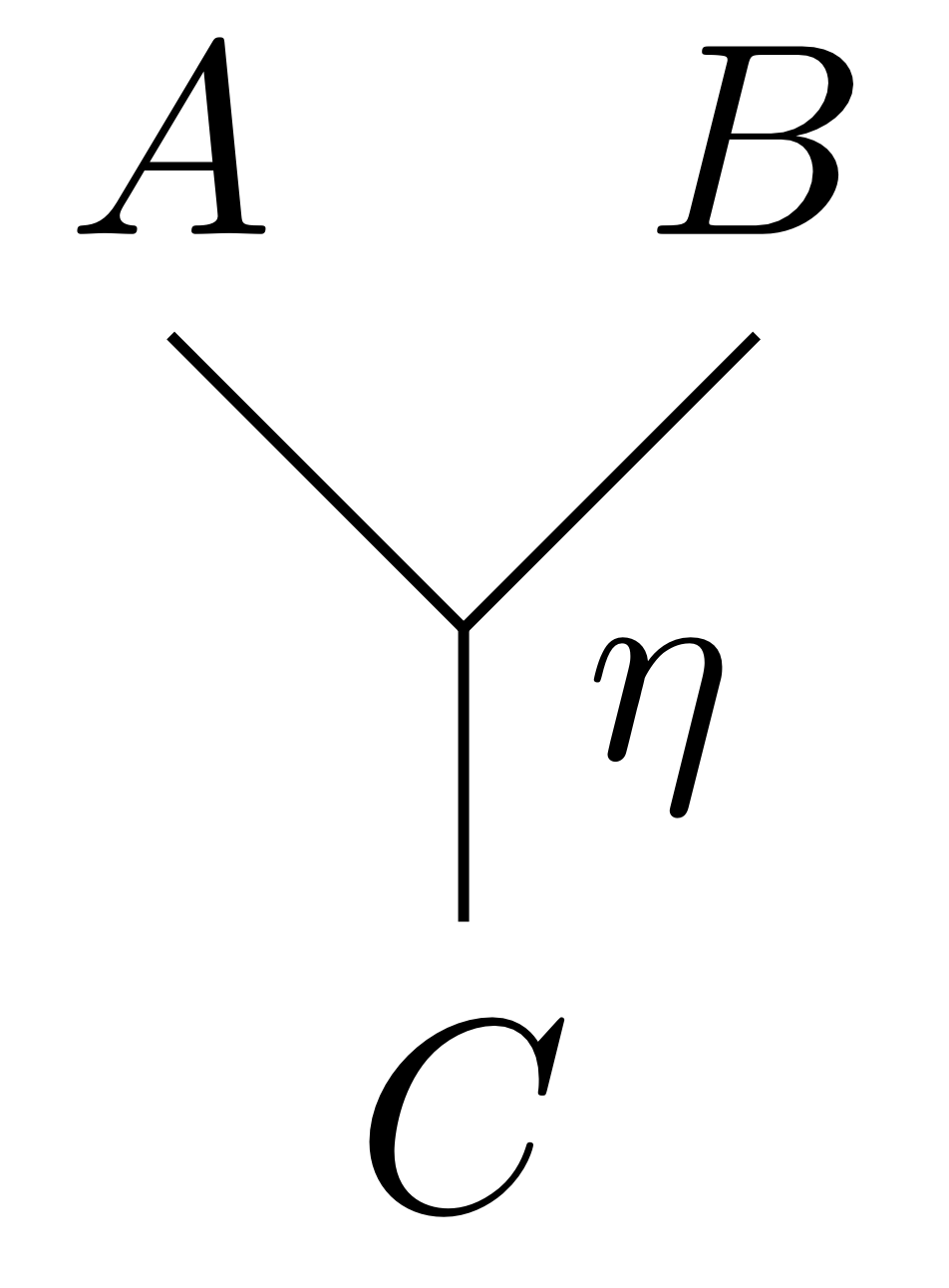
Elementary morphism in $\mathcal{C}$.

The composition of elementary morphisms can be used to define F-symbols. F-symbols are 10-index tensors which encode the associativity of the monoidal structure, similarly to 6j symbols. Given any simple objects $A,B,C,D,E,F\in\mathcal{C}$ and morphisms $\nu:E\to D\otimes C$, $\mu: D\to A\otimes B$, $\beta: E\to A\otimes F$, $\alpha: F\to B \otimes C$ there is an F-symbol $(F^{A,B,C}_{D; E,F})^{\mu,\nu}_{\alpha,\beta}$ . These symbols are defined implicitly via the relation

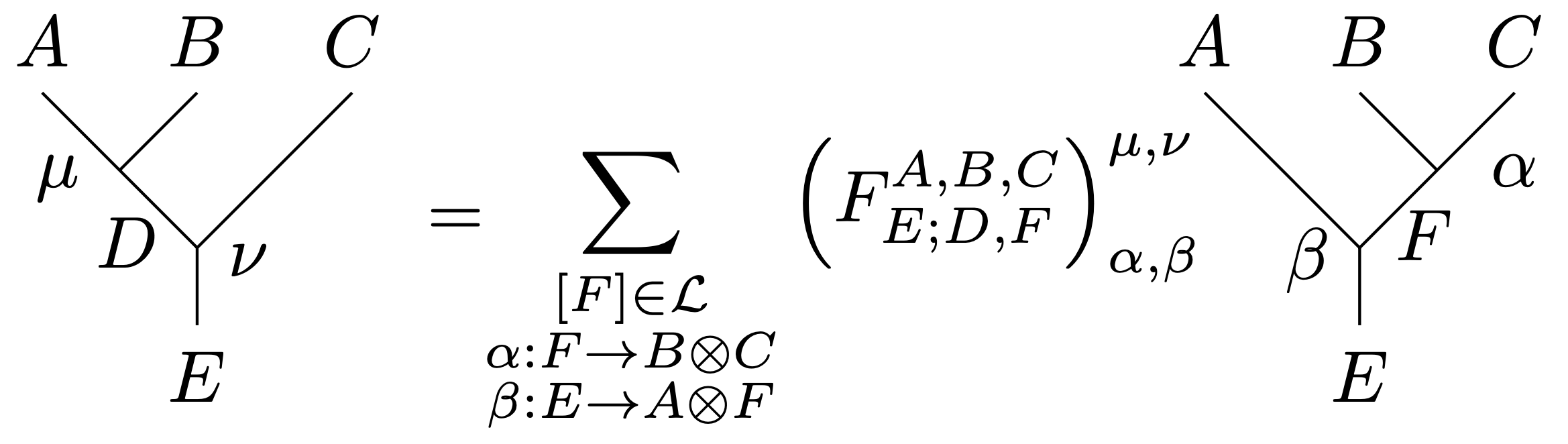
Implicit definition of F-symbols using string diagrams.

In this definition of F-symbols, the sum is taken over simple objects $[F]\in \mathcal{L}$, and some basis of maps $\alpha: F\to B \otimes C$ and $\beta: E\to A\otimes F$. The values of the F-symbols depend on this choice of basis. Choosing a different choice of basis of the elementary fusion spaces is called a gauge transformation on the F-symbols. By Schur's lemma, the dimension of the fusion spaces are equal to the fusion coefficients $\text{dim}_{\mathbb{C}}(\text{Hom}_{\mathcal{C}}(A,B\otimes C))=N^{A,B}_{C}$, so the number of values the indices take depend on the fusion coefficients.

== For multiplicity-free fusion categories ==
A fusion category is called multiplicity-free if all of its fusion coefficients are equal to 0 or 1. For a multiplicity-free fusion category, the four indices of F-symbols which index choices of morphisms become irrelevant. So, in this case, the F-symbols can be considered to only 6 indices. Seeing as this simplifies the process of skeletonization of fusion categories, many authors only define skeletonization for multiplicity-free fusion categories.

== For braided fusion categories ==
The braided monoidal structure on a fusion category can be depicted as follows.

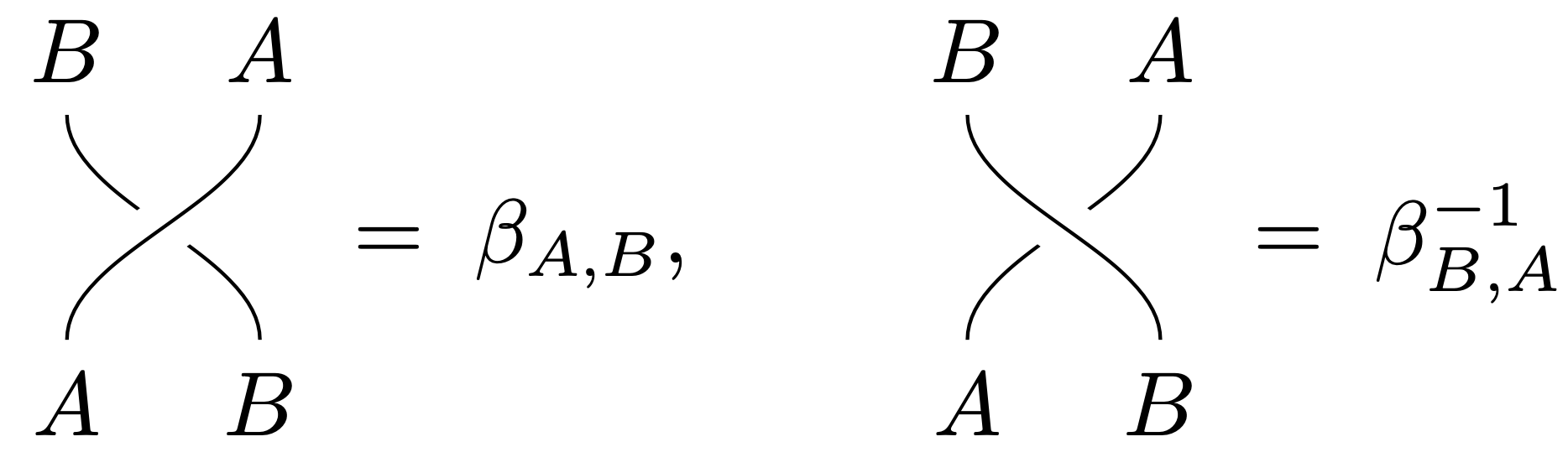
String diagram notation for a braided monoidal category.

We can use these elementary morphisms to define R-symbols. R-symbols are 5-index tensors which encode the braiding structure of the category. Given any simple objects $A,B,C\in\mathcal{C}$ and $\mu : A \to B \otimes C$ and $\nu: C \to B \otimes A$ there is an R-symbol $(R^{A,B}_{C})^{\mu}_{\nu}$. These symbols are defined implicitly via the relation

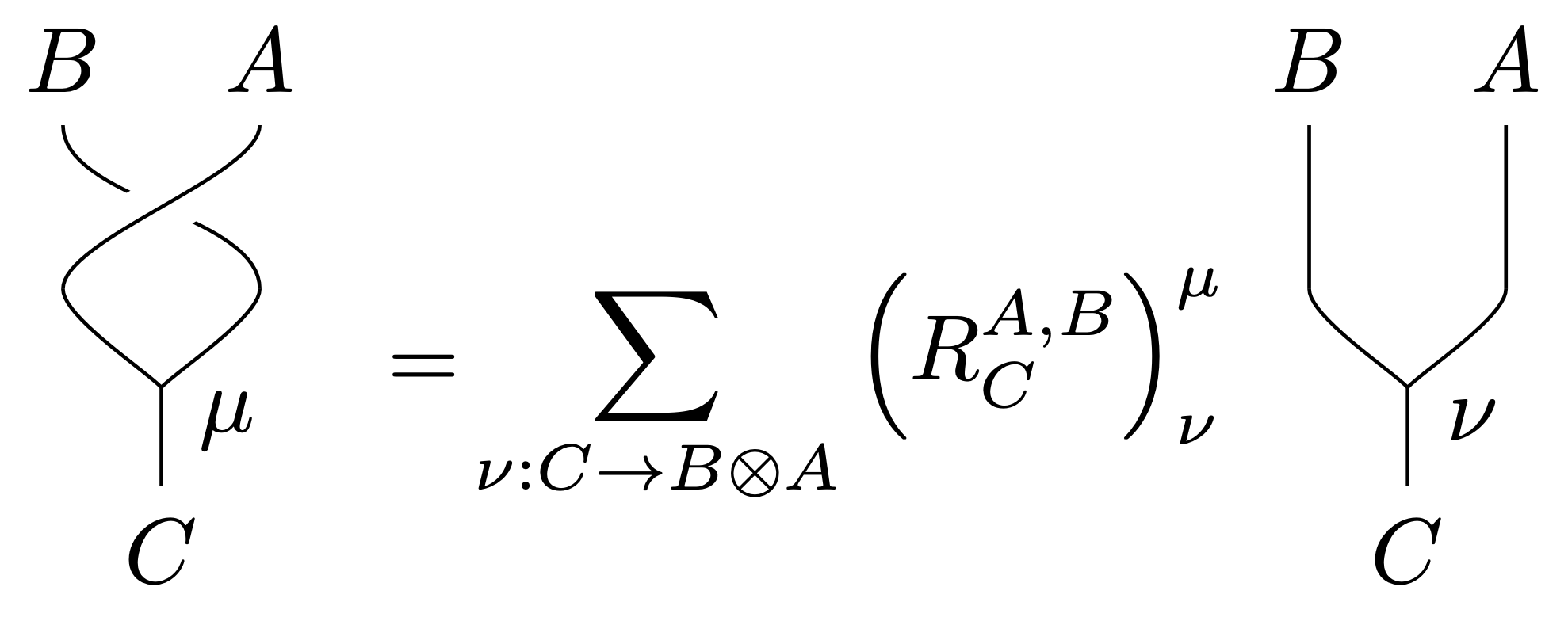
Implicit definition of R-symbols using string diagrams.

== For modular tensor categories ==
The pivotal structure on a modular tensor category (or more generally a pre-modular tensor category) can be encoded skeletally using $\theta$-symbols, also called twists. These theta symbols are mostly directly associated to the ribbon structure on $\mathcal{C}$. The ribbon structure is obtained from the braiding and the spherical structure by Deligne's twising lemma, which says that spherical structures and ribbon structures are equivalent in the presence of a braiding. Additionally, Deligne's twisting lemma says that pivotal structures are equivalent to By definition, a ribbon structure is a natural transformation $\theta: \text{id}_{\mathcal{C}} \to \text{id}_{\mathcal{C}}$ satisfying the conditions $\theta_{A\otimes B}=\beta_{B,A} \circ \beta_{A,B} \circ ( \theta_A \otimes \theta_B)$ and $\theta_{A^*} = (\theta_{A})^*$. Given any simple object $A\in \mathcal{C}$, we can identify the map $\theta_{A}:A\to A$ with the unique scalar $\lambda$ such that $\theta_{A}=\lambda\cdot {\text{id}_A}$. This scalar is called the $\theta$-symbol associated to the simple object $A$, and only depends on the isomorphism class of $A$.
