= Rank-finiteness =

In mathematics, rank-finiteness for fusion categories is a collection of related theorems and conjectures about structures related to fusion categories. The question is whether or not a given categorical structure related to fusion categories has finitely many or infinitely many equivalence classes of a given rank. The original result in this direction was Ocneanu rigidity, which asserts that every fusion ring has finitely many categorifications. A particularly relevant example to condensed matter physics is the rank-finiteness theorem for modular tensor categories.

Here and throughout, the rank of a fusion category refers to the number of isomorphism classes of simple objects it has.

== Ocneanu rigidity ==
The Ocneanu rigidity theorem, named after mathematician Adrian Ocneanu, asserts that every fusion ring has finitely many categorifications. Stated more directly, this means that are only finitely many equivalence classes of fusion categories with a given set of fusion rules. The braided version of Ocneanu rigidity states that there are only finitely many equivalence classes of braided fusion categories with a given set of fusion rules.

The proof of Ocneanu rigidity relies on the demonstrating vanishing of the Davydov-Yetter cohomology groups, which classify certain equivalence classes of deformations of fusion categories.

== Positive results on rank finiteness ==
There are several known cases of rank-finiteness. These

- The rank-finiteness theorem for modular tensor category is a theorem due to Paul Bruillard, Siu-Hung Ng, Eric Rowell, and Zhenghan Wang.
- The rank-finiteness theorem for braided fusion categories is a theorem due to Corey Jones, Scott Morrison, Dmitri Nikshych, and Eric Rowell.
- The rank-finiteness theorem for G-crossed braided fusion categories is a theorem, also due to Jones et al.
- The rank-finiteness theorem for super-modular tensor categories is a theorem, also due to Jones et al.

== Unknown results on rank finiteness ==
It is not known whether or not there are finitely many fusion categories of a given rank. Similarly, it is not known whether or not there are finitely many pivotal fusion categories and spherical fusion categories of a given rank. This is related to the other open problem of determining whether or not it is true that every fusion category admits a pivotal (or even spherical) structure.
