= Bruguières modularity theorem =

In mathematics, the Bruguières modularity theorem is a theorem about modular tensor categories. It asserts that two different formulations of the modularity condition of a modular tensor category are equivalent. The Bruguières modularity theorem was introduced by mathematician Alain Bruguières in the year 2000. The first notion of modularity used in the theorem statement is in terms of the non-degeneracy of the braid statistics of the simple objects, and the other is in terms of the non-degeneracy of the modular S-matrix. Historically, the non-degeneracy condition for modular tensor categories was originally stated in terms of the invertibility of the $S$-matrix. Nowadays, it is common to define modular category in terms of the non-degeneracy of its braiding statistics, especially in the condensed matter physics literature.

== Statement ==
The Bruguières modularity theorem is stated in terms of pre-modular tensor categories, a notion introduced by Bruguières in the same paper in which he proved the modularity theorem. A category $\mathcal{C}$ is called pre-modular if it is equipped with all of the structures of a modular tensor category, and satisfies all of the axioms except possibly for non-degeneracy. Bruguières' modularity theorem asserts that a pre-modular tensor category has non-degenerate braiding if and only if its modular S-matrix is invertible.

== Intuition ==
Let $\mathcal{C}$ denote a pre-modular tensor category. One direction of the Bruguières modularity theorem is straightforward - if the braiding is degenerate, then there will be a simple object $A\in \mathcal{C}$ which braids trivially with all the other simple objects, and so the column of the modular $S$-matrix corresponding to the simple object $A\in \mathcal{C}$ will be proportional to the column of the modular $S$-matrix associated to the tensor unit ${\bf 1}$. Thus, the $S$-matrix will be degenerate. The content of the theorem is that if the braiding is non-degenerate, then the modular $S$-matrix will be invertible.

If modular tensor categories are defined in terms of the non-degeneracy of their braiding, then the Bruguières modularity theorem is a necessary ingredient for the existence of the modular group representation. In the modular group representation the $S$-matrix is the image, up to scaling, of one of the generators of $\text{SL}_2(\mathbb{Z})$. As such, for the modular group representation to be a valid representation it is necessary for the $S$-matrix to be invertible.
