= Algebraic theory of topological quantum information =

Algebraic theory

The algebraic theory of topological quantum information is a collection of algebraic techniques developed and applied to topological aspects of condensed matter physics and quantum information. Often, this revolves around using categorical structures or cohomology theories to classify and describe various topological phases of matter, such as topological order and symmetry-protected topological order.

Often, the application of categorical models to topological systems comes from the fact that the objects the categories describe some sort of quasiparticles, and the structures on the category encode the ways in which these quasiparticles can interact with one another.

== The algebraic theory of (2+1)D bosonic topological order ==
The algebraic theory of (2+1)-dimensional bosonic topological order was introduced in 2006 by Alexei Kitaev. Every (2+1)-dimensional topologically ordered system is expected to host some sort of theory of anyons, describing the elementary point-like excitations in the system. The basic pieces of data describing the interactions between these anyons (such as fusion and braiding statistics) naturally fit together into the structure of a unitary modular tensor category. This data is called the anyon content of the topological phase. Anyon content is an incomplete characterization of topological order due to the existence of invertible topological phases, which are non-trivial yet host no anyons. Invertible phases are characterized not by their anyon data, but by a real number called their chiral central charge. It is widely believed that topological phases are uniquely determined by their anyon content and their chiral central charge.

The relationship between (2+1)-dimensional bosonic topological order and modular tensor categories can also be understood by passing through topological quantum field theory. It is widely believed that every topologically ordered system should have an effective field theory description which is a topological quantum field theory. In this way, we expect on physical grounds a correspondence between topological orders and topological quantum field theories. Seeing as (2+1)-dimensional topological quantum field theories are connected to modular tensor categories via the Reshetikhin–Turaev construction, this gives an indirect connection between (2+1)-dimensional bosonic topological order and topological quantum field theory.

=== Dictionary between categorical structures and anyon operations ===
There is a general dictionary between the categorical structures of a unitary modular tensor category and the physical operations one can perform with anyons in two-dimensional bosonic topologically ordered systems.

This dictionary is described below in a special case for Fibonacci anyons.

The evaluation maps $\cup$ are interpreted as operators which spontaneously create pairs of anyons. Braiding maps are interpreted as braiding operators. The coevaluation maps $\cap$ are more subtle, and are interpreted in terms of measurements. The cap corresponds to an operator which projects the state onto sectors for which the two relevant adjacent anyons have overall fusion channel to the vacuum (trivial particle type). Equivalently, this can be interpreted as a measurement of the overall topological charge between the two relevant adjacent anyons, with post-selection performed so that the result is the vacuum. In this way, every collection of compositions of basic morphisms can be translated into a physical process on anyons.

To make this translation between category theory and anyons correct, it is important to use the right normalization. In the case of Fibonacci anyons, this normalization is given below.

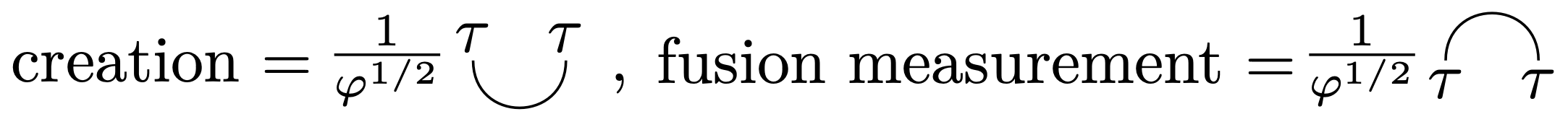
Physical normalization of creation and fusion measurements for Fibonacci anyons.

== See also ==
- Unitary modular tensor category (and Modular tensor category)
- Fibonacci anyons (and Fibonacci category)
