= Schauenburg–Ng theorem =

In mathematics, the Schauenbug–Ng theorem is a theorem about the modular group representations of modular tensor categories proved by Siu-Hung Ng and Peter Schauenburg in 2010. It asserts that that the kernels of the modular representations of all modular tensor categories are congruence subgroups of $\text{SL}_2(\mathbb{Z})$. Since congruence subgroups all have finite index in $\text{SL}_2(\mathbb{Z})$, this implies in particular that the modular representations of all modular representations have finite image.

On physical grounds coming from conformal field theory, it has been conjectured since 1987 by Greg Moore and others that the kernel of the modular group representations should be congruence subgroups. The proof by Schauenbug and Ng came after a series of partial results by other mathematicians, which proved the theorem in special cases.

To prove their result Schauenbug and Ng introduced the notion of 'generalied Frobenius–Schur' indicators, which have since found separate applications to mathematical physics.
