= Unitarian trick =

Device in the representation theory of Lie groups

In mathematics, the unitarian trick (or unitary trick) is a device in the representation theory of Lie groups, introduced by Adolf Hurwitz (1897) for the special linear group and by Hermann Weyl for general semisimple groups. It applies to show that the representation theory of some complex Lie group G is in a qualitative way controlled by that of some compact real Lie group K, and the latter representation theory is easier. An important example is that in which G is the complex general linear group GL_{n}(C), and K the unitary group U(n) acting on vectors of the same size. From the fact that the representations of K are completely reducible, the same is concluded for the complex-analytic representations of G, at least in finite dimensions.

The relationship between G and K that drives this connection is traditionally expressed in the terms that the Lie algebra of K is a real form of that of G. In the theory of algebraic groups, the relationship can also be put that K is a dense subset of G, for the Zariski topology.

The trick works for reductive Lie groups G, of which an important case are semisimple Lie groups.

== Formulations ==
The "trick" is stated in a number of ways in contemporary mathematics. One such formulation is for G a reductive group over the complex numbers. Then G_{an}, the complex points of G considered as a Lie group, has a compact subgroup K that is Zariski-dense. For the case of the special linear group, this result was proved for its special unitary subgroup by Issai Schur (1924, presaged by earlier work). The special linear group is a complex semisimple Lie group. For any such group G and maximal compact subgroup K, and V a complex vector space of finite dimension which is a G-module, its G-submodules and K-submodules are the same.

In the Encyclopedia of Mathematics, the formulation is

The classical compact Lie groups ... have the same complex linear representations and the same invariant subspaces in tensor spaces as their complex envelopes [...]. Therefore, results of the theory of linear representations obtained for the classical complex Lie groups can be carried over to the corresponding compact groups and vice versa.

In terms of Tannakian formalism, Claude Chevalley interpreted Tannaka duality starting from a compact Lie group K as constructing the "complex envelope" G as the dual reductive algebraic group Tn(K) over the complex numbers. Veeravalli S. Varadarajan wrote of the "unitarian trick" as "the canonical correspondence between compact and complex semisimple complex groups discovered by Weyl", noting the "closely related duality theories of Chevalley and Tannaka", and later developments that followed on quantum groups.

== History ==
Adolf Hurwitz had shown how integration over a compact Lie group could be used to construct invariants, in the cases of unitary groups and compact orthogonal groups. Issai Schur in 1924 showed that this technique can be applied to show complete reducibility of representations for such groups via the construction of an invariant inner product. Weyl extended Schur's method to complex semisimple Lie algebras by showing they had a compact real form.

== Weyl's theorem ==
The complete reducibility of finite-dimensional linear representations of compact groups, or connected semisimple Lie groups and complex semisimple Lie algebras goes sometimes under the name of Weyl's theorem. A related result, that the universal cover of a compact semisimple Lie group is also compact, also goes by the same name. It was proved by Weyl a few years before "universal cover" had a formal definition.

== Explicit formulas ==
Let $\pi: G \rightarrow GL(n,\mathbb{C})$ be a complex representation of a compact Lie group $G$. Define $P = \int_G \pi(g)\pi(g)^*dg$, integrating over $G$ with respect to the Haar measure. Since $P$ is a positive matrix, there exists a square root $Q$ such that $P=Q^2$. For each $g \in G$, the matrix $\tau(g) = Q^{-1}\pi(g)Q$ is unitary.
