= Fibonacci anyons =

Particle

In condensed matter physics, a Fibonacci anyon is a type of anyon which lives in two-dimensional topologically ordered systems. The Fibonacci anyon $\tau$ is distinguished uniquely by the fact that it satisfies the fusion rule $\tau \otimes \tau = {\bf 1} \oplus \tau$. Alternatively, the Fibonacci anyon can be defined by fact that it is algebraically described by the unique non-trivial simple object in the Fibonacci category.

Experimentally, it has been proposed that Fibonacci anyons could be hosted in the fractional quantum Hall system. In particular, it is possible that Fibonacci anyons are present in the system with filling factor $\nu=12/5$.

Fibonacci anyons have primary been developed in the context of topological quantum computing. This is because these anyons allow for universal quantum computing based entirely on braiding and performing topological charge measurements, and hence form a natural setting for topological quantum computing. This is in contrast to anyons based on discrete gauge theory, which require a more subtle use of ancillas to perform universal quantum computation.

== The Fibonacci category ==
Mathematically, the Fibonacci anyons are identified by the fact that they are described by the Fibonacci category, a certain modular tensor category. Due to its connections with quantum field theory and its particularly simple structure, the Fibonacci category was among the first modular tensor categories to be considered. It was developed in the early 2000s by Michael Freedman, Zhenghan Wang, and Michael Larsen in the context of topological quantum computation via Fibonacci anyons. The term 'Fibonacci category' was coined by Greg Kuperberg, in reference to the fact that its fusion rules are described by Fibonacci numbers.

The Fibonacci category ${\bf Fib}$ is defined as follows. The set of simple objects of ${\bf Fib}$ has size two, and is denoted $\mathcal{L}=\{1,\tau\}$. Its non-trivial fusion rule is given by $\tau \otimes \tau = 1\oplus \tau$. The other fusion rules are $\tau \otimes 1 = 1 \otimes \tau = \tau$ and $1\otimes 1 =1$. The twist values are $\theta_1=1$ and $\theta_{\tau}=e^{4\pi i/5}$. The R-symbols are $R^{\tau,\tau}_{1}=e^{-4\pi i/5}$, $R^{\tau,\tau}_{\tau}=e^{3\pi i /5}$, and $R^{1,1}_1 =R^{1,\tau}_{\tau}=R^{\tau,1}_{\tau}=1$. All non-zero F-symbols are all equal to 1, except for the symbols $F^{\tau,\tau,\tau}_{\tau; 1,1}=\varphi^{-1}$, $F^{\tau,\tau,\tau}_{\tau; \tau, 1} = F^{\tau,\tau,\tau}_{\tau;1,\tau} = \varphi^{- 1/2}$, and $F^{\tau,\tau,\tau}_{\tau;\tau,\tau}=-\varphi^{- 1}$ where $\varphi$ is the golden ratio.

== Algebraic properties ==
The Fibonacci category has several notable algebraic properties.

- Taking the trace of the identity $\tau\otimes \tau = 1 \oplus \tau$, one arrives at the formula $d_\tau^2=1+d_\tau$ where $d_\tau$ is the quantum dimension of $\tau$. Seeing as the Fibonacci category is unitary all of its quantum dimensions are positive, and so $d_\tau=\varphi$ is the Golden ratio, the unique positive solution to the equation $x^2=1+x$. It is a theorem that any simple object in unitary modular tensor category whose quantum dimension $d$ satisfies $1\leq d < 2$ must be of the form $d=2\cos(\pi/n)$ for some $n\geq 3$. This theorem is consistent with the Fibonacci category, since $\varphi=2\cos(\pi/5)$.
- The Fibonacci category is the unique unitary modular tensor category with exactly one non-trivial simple object, such that this non-trivial object is non-abelian (in the sense that is quantum dimension is greater than one). There is one other unitary modular tensor category with exactly one non-trivial simple object, known as the semion category, but its non-trivial object is abelian.
- There is a fusion relation $\tau^{\otimes n} = F_{n-1} \oplus F_{n} \tau$, where $F_{n}$ is the $n$th Fibonacci number, normalized so that $F_0=0$ and $F_1=1$. Here, $\tau^{\otimes n}$ denotes the $n$-fold tensor product of $\tau$ with itself, and $F_{n}\tau$ denotes the $F_{n}$-fold direct sum of $\tau$ with itself. This relation can be proved using a simple induction. It is from this relation that the Fibonacci category gets its name.

== Relationship to topological quantum field theory ==
In the context of topological quantum field theory, the Fibonacci category corresponds to the quantum Chern–Simons theory with gauge group $G=SO(3)$ at level $k=5$. Seeing as $\text{SO}(3)$ is a double cover of $\text{SU}(2)$, the Fibonacci category can alternatively be described as the even sectors in the Chern–Simons theory with gauge group $G=\text{SU}(2)$ at level $k=3$.

From this perspective, one can see a connection between Fibonacci anyons and the Jones polynomial polynomial using the classical techniques of Edward Witten. In his seminal 1989 paper, Witten demonstrated that the link and manifold invariants of quantum Chern–Simons theory with gauge group $G=SU(2)$ are related intimately to the Jones polynomial evaluated at roots of unity. Since the Fibonacci category is related to $G=\text{SU}(2)$ Chern–Simons theory, this gives a relation between the Fibonacci category and the Jones polynomial.

A key insight of Michael Freedman in 1997 was to compare Witten's results with the fact that the evaluation of the Jones polynomial at $k$th roots of unity is a computationally difficult problem. In particular, evaluating the Jones polynomial exactly is a #P-complete problem whenever $k=5$ and $k\geq 7$, and giving an additive approximation of the Jones polynomial is BQP-complete whenever $k=5$ and $k\geq 7$. Under Witten's correspondence, the Fibonacci theory (related to $G=\text{SU}(2)$ at level $k=3$) is related to the Jones polynomial evaluated at 5th roots of unity, and thus when appropriately used can allow one to resolve BQP-complete problems.

== Relationship to the Yang–Lee edge theory ==
The Fibonacci modular category is related to a separate model from non-unitary conformal field theory, known as the Yang–Lee theory. This theory describes the behavior of the two-dimensional Ising model in its paramagnetic phase at its critical imaginary value of magnetic field. It was shown by John Cardy that the Yang–Lee theory has two primary fields, denoted $\mathbb{I}$ and $\Phi$, and that they satisfy the non-trivial fusion relation $\Phi \otimes \Phi = \mathbb{I}\oplus \Phi$. This is the same fusion relation of the Fibonacci category. The Yang–Lee theory is related to a non-unitary conformal field theory, and as such it corresponds to a non-unitary modular tensor category.

Despite having the same fusion rules, the modular tensor category associated to the Yang–Lee theory is not the same as the Fibonacci modular category. The difference between these two categories is present in their associativity and braiding rules. The relationship between these two theories is that the Yang–Lee theory is the Galois conjugate of the Fibonacci theory. Namely, there exists an automorphism $\sigma: \overline{\mathbb{Q}}\to \overline{\mathbb{Q}}$ living in the absolute Galois group of the rational numbers such that applying $\sigma$ to all of the data of the Fibonacci theory recovers the data of the Yang-Lee theory. This means that for any F-symbol $F^{a,b,c}_{d;e,f}$ or R-symbol $R^{a,b}_{c}$ of the Fibonacci theory, the corresponding F-symbol or R-symbol of the Yang–Lee theory is $\sigma(F^{a,b,c}_{d;e,f})$ or $\sigma(R^{a,b}_c)$.

== Relationship to Jones polynomial ==
The Fibonacci category is related to the Kauffman bracket by the fact that the Reshetikhin–Turaev invariant of framed links associated to $\bf Fib$ is equal to the Kauffman bracket with parameter $A=e^{3\pi i /5}$. Since the Kauffman bracket is related to the Jones polynomial via a change of normalization, there is also a close relationship between $\bf Fib$ and the Jones polynomial.

The technical insight which relates the framed link invariants associated in $\bf Fib$ to the Kauffman bracket is the low-dimensionality of the hom-spaces in the Fibonacci category, which implies the existence many linear relationships between its morphisms. In particular, the hom-space $\text{Hom}_{\bf Fib}(\tau \otimes \tau, \tau \otimes \tau)$ is two-dimensional since $\tau = 1 \oplus \tau$. Using standard techniques to compute its coefficients, the following linear relationship is seen to be true:

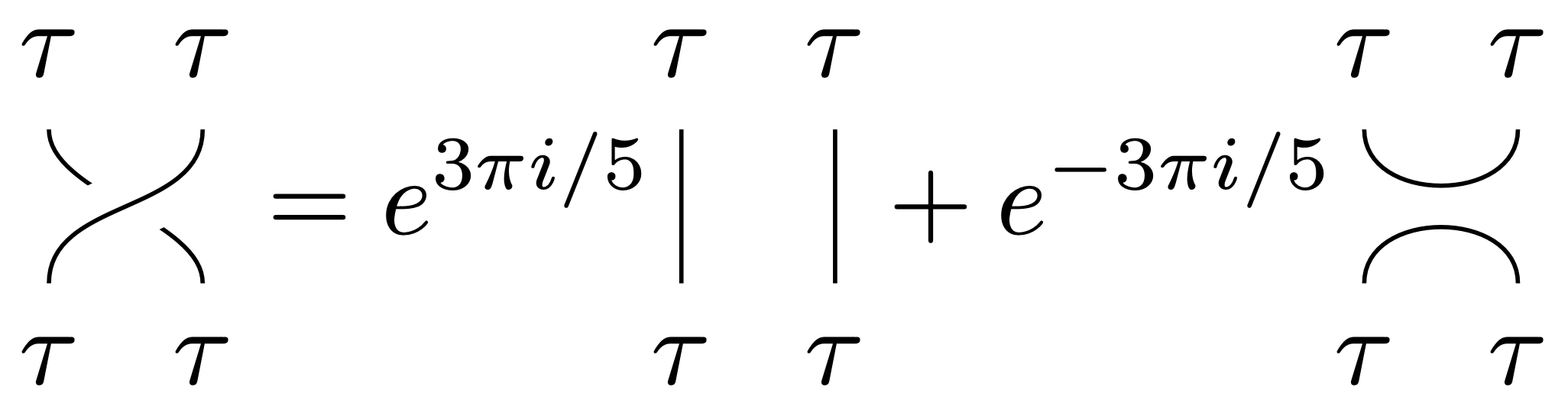
Skein relation satisfied by the unique non-trivial simple object in the Fibonacci category.

This can be compared with the usual Skein relation for the Kauffman bracket, with $A=e^{3\pi i /5}$.

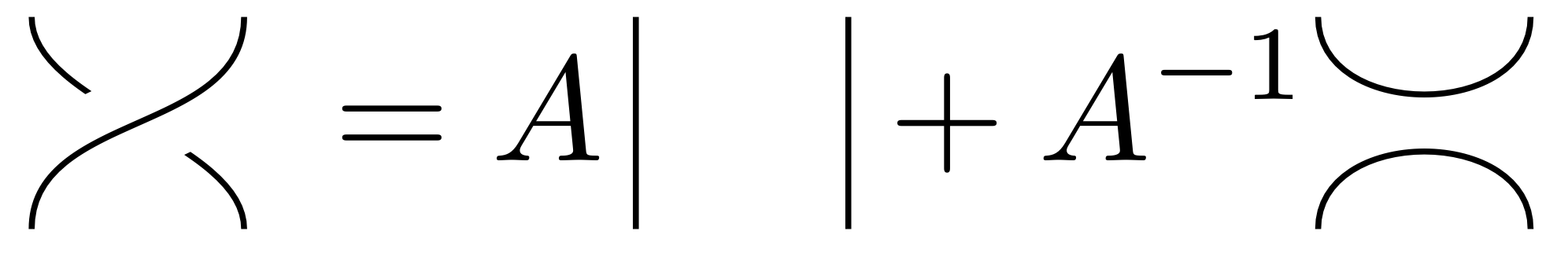
The Skein relation for the Kauffman bracket.

=== As an extended invariant ===
Due to the existence of a morphism $\tau \otimes \tau \to \tau$, the Fibonacci category naturally also lends itself to defining invariants of a generalization of links that allows for degree 3 vertices ("branchings"). These invariants can also be defined using generalized Skein relations. To do this, one chooses some distinguished morphisms $\tau \otimes \tau \to \tau$ and $\tau \to \tau \otimes \tau$, depicted visually below.

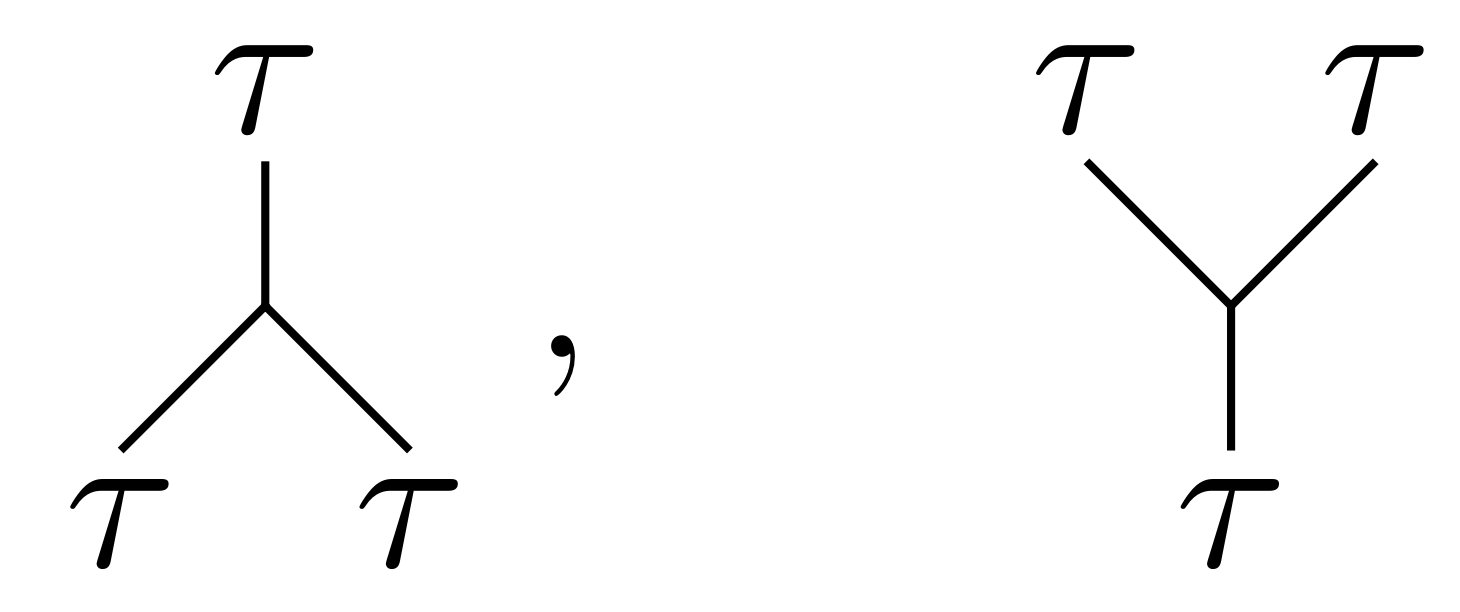
String diagrams for some distinguished morphisms $\tau \otimes \tau \to \tau$ and $\tau \to \tau \otimes \tau$ in the Fibonacci category.

Choosing these distinguished morphisms so that

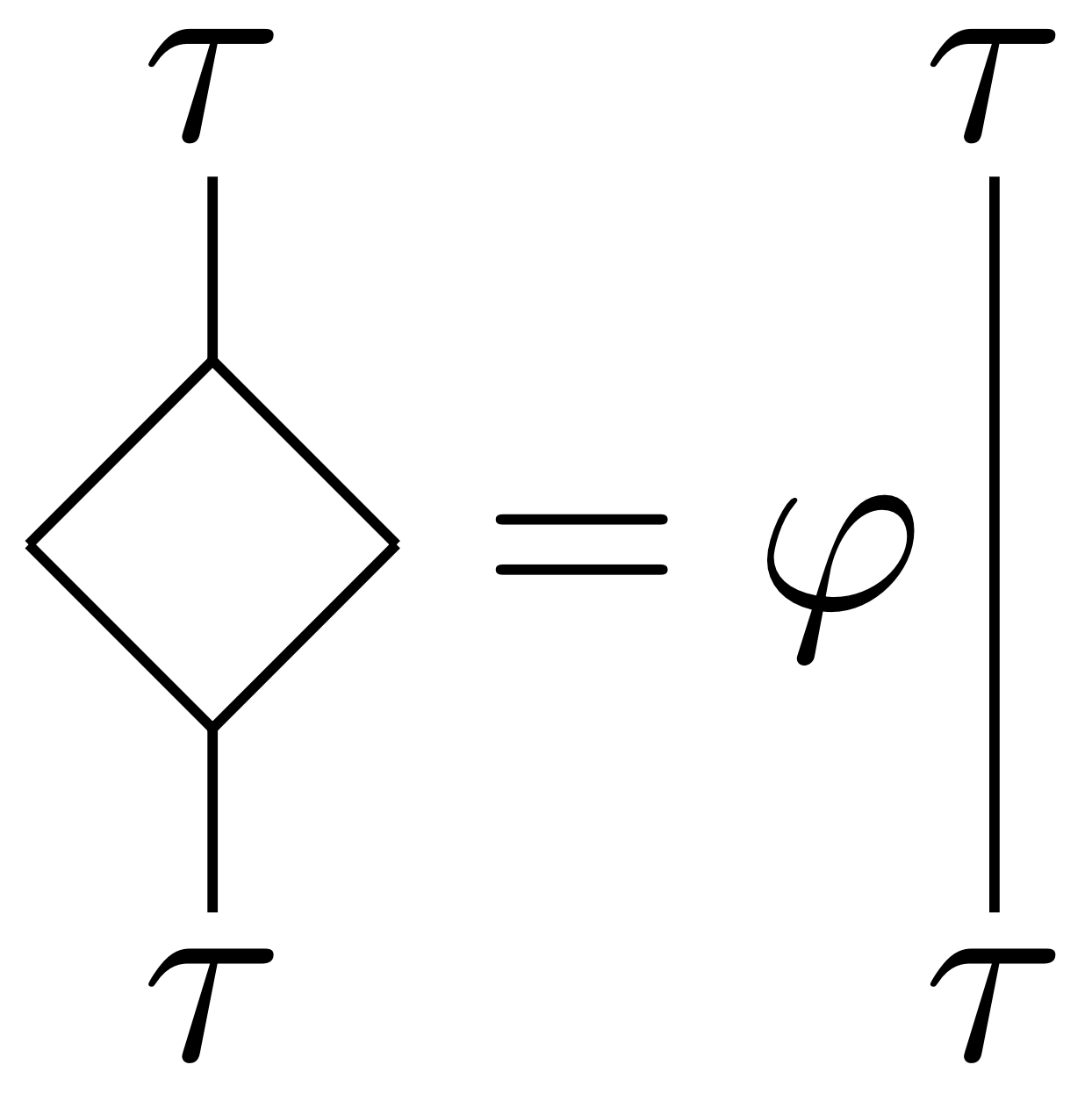
A choice of normalization

Then the following generalized Skein relation holds:

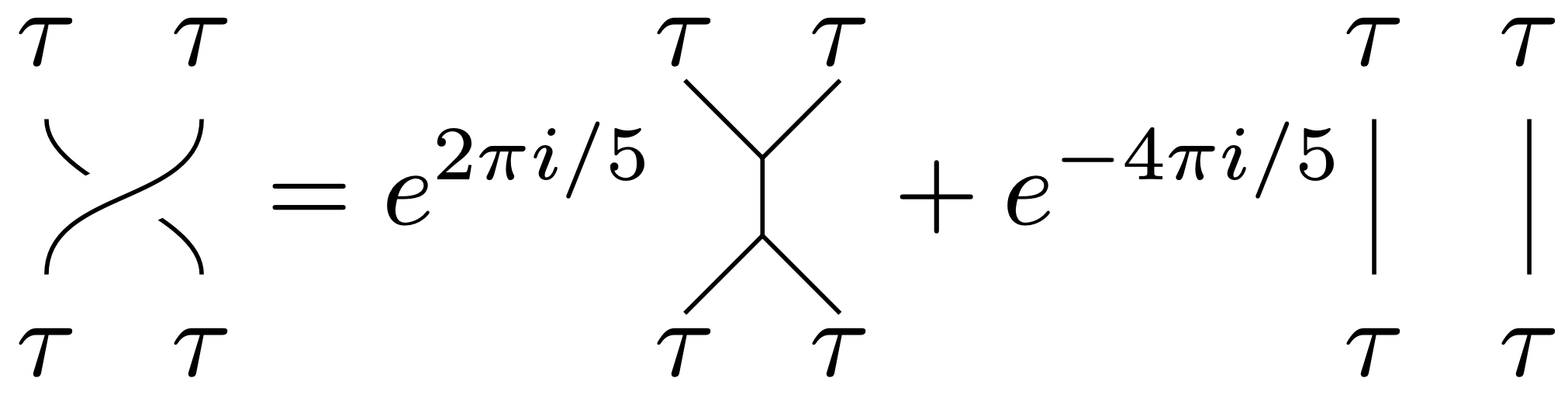
Generalized Skein relation for the Fibonacci category, with a branching

Note that to make a proper topological invariant it is necessary to keep track of more structure on the links, such as orientations on the strands.

== Method for universal quantum computing ==
The pipeline for universal quantum computing with Fibonacci anyons can be described as follows. First, one is given an instance of a decision problem which is in the complexity class BQP (for instance, a large integer whose factorization one wishes to determine). Since the problem of additively approximating a normalization of the Jones polynomial at a third root of unity is BQP complete, this means by definition that there is a polynomial time classical algorithm for taking any efficient quantum circuit an assigning to it a framed link such that an additive approximation of the Jones invariant (or really, Kauffman bracket) of that link evaluated at $e^{3\pi i /5}$ encodes the solution of the decision problem. For example, using this procedure, Shor's algorithm for factoring an integer would correspond to some large link. To relate the Kauffman bracket of this link evaluated at $e^{3\pi i /5}$ to the physical world, one would take some material which hosts Fibonacci anyons, and perform a series of creation, braiding, and fusion operators such that the spacetime trajectories of the Fibonacci anyons in this process form the link outputted in the previous step of the process. One would then repeat this experiment polynomially many times, and record the probability that all of the fusion measurements resulted in the vacuum sector. The algebraic properties of the Fibonacci category imply that this probability is approximately equal to the Kauffman bracket evaluated at $e^{3\pi i /5}$, up to normalization by some power of the golden ratio. By construction, there is then a polynomial time classical algorithm for taking this approximation and using it to deduce the result of the original decision problem with high probability (for instance, in the case of factoring, this algorithm would use the digits of the approximation of the normalized Kauffman bracket to recover the factorization of the input integer). This pipeline is demonstrated below

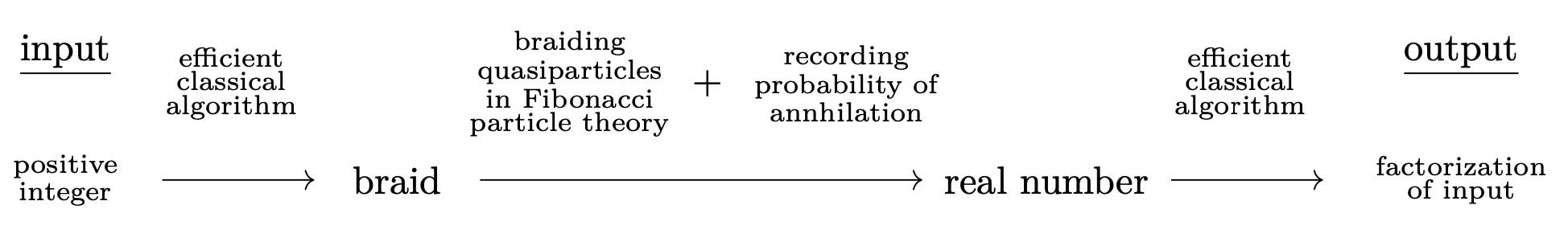
A pipeline for universal quantum computing with Fibonacci anyons, illustrated with the example of factoring integers using Shor's algorithm.

== Efficient universality: braid compilation ==
The full Hilbert state space of a collection of Fibonacci anyons is not a tensor product of its proper subsystems, which can be easily seen from the fact that the dimension of such state space is a number $F_n$ in the Fibonacci sequence. For each $F_n > 1$ there is an appropriate anyonic fusion tree such that natural action of the corresponding braiding group is irreducible in $\mathbb{C}^{F_n}$ and dense in the $SU(F_n)$.

However, the fact that any $U\in SU(F_n)$ can be approximated by an anyonic braid is existential in nature and can be reduced to practice only given a body of classical braid synthesis algorithms. Such algorithms for $F_3=2$, based on Monte Carlo approach have been developed in. Proposed Monte Carlo methods are agnostic with respect to algebraic structure of braid matrices and while preserving reasonable generality, they are suboptimal both in terms of classical runtime and the depth of the resulting compiled braids. Algorithm of is informed by number-theoretical properties of the anyonic braid group representations that are specific to the Fibonacci anyons. That algorithm yields compiled braids with asymptotically optimal depth and has optimal polynomial classical runtime.
