= Unitary modular tensor category =

In mathematics, a unitary modular tensor category is a certain type of algebraic structure, defined by equipping a modular tensor category with additional data that reflects the principle of unitarity in quantum mechanics. Unitary modular tensor categories are relevant to the algebraic theory of topological quantum information since they conjecturally provide a complete description of the algebraic properties of anyons in 2-dimensional topologically ordered systems.

Mathematically, a unitary modular tensor category is defined to be a modular tensor category in which all of the hom-spaces are equipped with inner products, compatible with each other and with the additional structures on the modular tensor category. On the level of skeletonization, a unitary modular tensor category has the same structure as a modular tensor category except that the F-symbols and R-symbols are required to assemble into unitary matrices. The allowed gauge transformations on a unitary modular tensor category must be unitary changes of basis.

== Uniqueness of unitary structure ==
Importantly, if a modular tensor category admits a unitary structure then it is a theorem of David Reutter that this unitary structure is unique. This means that even though unitarity is defined as a structure, it can be treated as a property. On physical grounds, it is expected that all of the modular tensor categories arising from topological order should be unitary modular tensor categories. In fact, it is believed that every unitary modular tensor category should describe the anyon content of some topological phase. Every unitary fusion category admits a canonical spherical structure inherited from the inner product on its hom-spaces. As such, there is no distinction between "unitary fusion category" and "unitary spherical fusion category". Thus, a unitary modular tensor category can be defined as a unitary braided fusion category, with no reference to spherical structure.
