= Tadao Tannaka =

Japanese mathematician

- Born: December 27, 1908; Matsuyama, Ehime Prefecture, Japan
- Died: October 25, 1986 (aged 77); Tokyo, Japan
- Education: Tohoku University
- Known for: Tannaka–Krein duality Tannakian formalism
- Awards: 3rd Class Order of the Rising Sun (1980)
- Scientific career
- Fields: Mathematics
- Workplaces: Tohoku University; Tohoku Gakuin University; Institute for Advanced Study

Tadao Tannaka (淡中 忠郎, Tannaka Tadao; December 27, 1908 – October 25, 1986) was a Japanese mathematician who worked in algebraic number theory.

== Biography ==
Tannaka was born in Matsuyama, Ehime Prefecture on December 27, 1908. After receiving a Bachelor of Science in mathematics from Tohoku Imperial University in 1932, he was appointed a lecturer in the university in 1934 and received a Doctor of Science degree from the university in 1941. He was promoted to assistant professor in 1942 and full professor in 1945. Tannaka was a member at the Institute for Advanced Study from September 1955 to April 1957. Tannaka retired from Tohoku University in 1972, after which he served as a full professor at Tohoku Gakuin University until 1981.

Tannaka was an editor of the Tohoku Mathematical Journal and a member of the board of directors of the Mathematical Society of Japan. Tannaka was also in charge of the "Mathematics Chat" article series in the monthly Mathematics for Universities magazine from 1960 onwards.

Tannaka died in Tokyo on October 25, 1986.

== Research ==
Tannaka is known for developing the theory of Tannaka–Krein duality, which generalizes Pontryagin duality to noncommutative compact groups and led to the development of Tannakian formalism.

== Awards ==
Tannaka was a recipient of the Order of the Rising Sun (3rd Class) in 1980.

== See also ==
- Tannaka–Artin problem
