= Tannaka–Krein duality =

Duality between a group and its representations

In mathematics, Tannaka–Krein duality theory concerns the interaction of a compact topological group and its category of linear representations. It is a natural extension of Pontryagin duality, between compact and discrete commutative topological groups, to groups that are compact but noncommutative. The theory is named after Tadao Tannaka and Mark Grigorievich Krein. In contrast to the case of commutative groups considered by Lev Pontryagin, the notion dual to a noncommutative compact group is not a group, but a category of representations Π(G) with some additional structure, formed by the finite-dimensional representations of G.

Duality theorems of Tannaka and Krein describe the converse passage from the category Π(G) back to the group G, allowing one to recover the group from its category of representations. Moreover, they in effect completely characterize all categories that can arise from a group in this fashion. Alexander Grothendieck later showed that by a similar process, Tannaka duality can be extended to the case of algebraic groups via Tannakian formalism. Meanwhile, the original theory of Tannaka and Krein continued to be developed and refined by mathematical physicists. A generalization of Tannaka–Krein theory provides the natural framework for studying representations of quantum groups, and is currently being extended to quantum supergroups, quantum groupoids and their dual Hopf algebroids.

== The idea of Tannaka–Krein duality: category of representations of a group ==
In Pontryagin duality theory for locally compact commutative groups, the dual object to a group G is its character group $\hat{G},$ which consists of its one-dimensional unitary representations. If we allow the group G to be noncommutative, the most direct analogue of the character group is the set of equivalence classes of irreducible unitary representations of G. The analogue of the product of characters is the tensor product of representations. However, irreducible representations of G in general fail to form a group, or even a monoid, because a tensor product of irreducible representations is not necessarily irreducible. It turns out that one needs to consider the set $\Pi(G)$ of all finite-dimensional representations, and treat it as a monoidal category, where the product is the usual tensor product of representations, and the dual object is given by the operation of the contragredient representation.

A representation of the category $\Pi(G)$ is a monoidal natural transformation from the identity functor $\operatorname{id}_{\Pi(G)}$ to itself. In other words, it is a non-zero function $\varphi$ that associates with any $T \in \operatorname{Ob}\Pi(G)$ an endomorphism of the space of T and satisfies the conditions of compatibility with tensor products, $\varphi(T\otimes U)=\varphi(T)\otimes\varphi(U)$, and with arbitrary intertwining operators $f\colon T\to U$, namely, $f\circ \varphi(T) = \varphi(U) \circ f$. The collection $\Gamma(\Pi(G))$ of all representations of the category $\Pi(G)$ can be endowed with multiplication $\varphi\psi(T)=\varphi(T)\psi(T)$ and topology, in which convergence is defined pointwise, i.e., a sequence $\{\varphi_a\}$ converges to some $\varphi$ if and only if $\{\varphi_a(T)\}$ converges to $\varphi(T)$ for all $T \in \operatorname{Ob}\Pi(G)$. It can be shown that the set $\Gamma(\Pi(G))$ thus becomes a compact (topological) group.

== Theorems of Tannaka and Krein ==
Tannaka's theorem provides a way to reconstruct the compact group G from its category of representations Π(G).

Let G be a compact group and let F: Π(G) → Vect_{C} be the forgetful functor from finite-dimensional complex representations of G to complex finite-dimensional vector spaces. One puts a topology on the natural transformations τ: F → F by setting it to be the coarsest topology possible such that each of the projections End(F) → End(V) given by $\tau \mapsto \tau_V$ (taking a natural transformation $\tau$ to its component $\tau_V$ at $V \in \Pi(G)$) is a continuous function. We say that a natural transformation is tensor-preserving if it is the identity map on the trivial representation of G, and if it preserves tensor products in the sense that $\tau_{V \otimes W} = \tau_V \otimes \tau_W$. We also say that τ is self-conjugate if $\overline{\tau} = \tau$ where the bar denotes complex conjugation. Then the set $\mathcal{T}(G)$ of all tensor-preserving, self-conjugate natural transformations of F is a closed subset of End(F), which is in fact a (compact) group whenever G is a (compact) group. Every element x of G gives rise to a tensor-preserving self-conjugate natural transformation via multiplication by x on each representation, and hence one has a map $G \to \mathcal{T}(G)$. Tannaka's theorem then says that this map is an isomorphism.

Krein's theorem answers the following question: which categories can arise as a dual object to a compact group?

Let Π be a category of finite-dimensional vector spaces, endowed with operations of tensor product and involution. The following conditions are necessary and sufficient in order for Π to be a dual object to a compact group G.

1. There exists an object $I$ with the property that $I\otimes A \approx A$ for all objects A of Π (which will necessarily be unique up to isomorphism).
2. Every object A of Π can be decomposed into a sum of minimal objects.
3. If A and B are two minimal objects then the space of homomorphisms Hom_{Π}(A, B) is either one-dimensional (when they are isomorphic) or is equal to zero.

If all these conditions are satisfied then the category Π = Π(G), where G is the group of the representations of Π.

== Generalization ==
Interest in Tannaka–Krein duality theory was reawakened in the 1980s with the discovery of quantum groups in the work of Drinfeld and Jimbo. One of the main approaches to the study of a quantum group proceeds through its finite-dimensional representations, which form a category akin to the symmetric monoidal categories Π(G), but of more general type, braided monoidal category. It turned out that a good duality theory of Tannaka–Krein type also exists in this case and plays an important role in the theory of quantum groups by providing a natural setting in which both the quantum groups and their representations can be studied. Shortly afterwards different examples of braided monoidal categories were found in rational conformal field theory. Tannaka–Krein philosophy suggests that braided monoidal categories arising from conformal field theory can also be obtained from quantum groups, and in a series of papers, Kazhdan and Lusztig proved that it was indeed so. On the other hand, braided monoidal categories arising from certain quantum groups were applied by Reshetikhin and Turaev to construction of new invariants of knots.

== Doplicher–Roberts theorem ==
The Doplicher–Roberts theorem (due to Sergio Doplicher and John E. Roberts) characterises Rep(G) in terms of category theory, as a type of subcategory of the category of Hilbert spaces. Such subcategories of compact group unitary representations on Hilbert spaces are:

1. a strict symmetric monoidal C*-category with conjugates
2. a subcategory having subobjects and direct sums, such that the C*-algebra of endomorphisms of the monoidal unit contains only scalars.

== See also ==
- Gelfand–Naimark theorem
