= Associativity isomorphism =

Concept from category theory

In mathematics, specifically in the field of category theory, the associativity isomorphism implements the notion of associativity with respect to monoidal products in semi-groupal (or monoidal-without-unit) categories.

== Definition ==
A category, $\mathcal{C}$, is called semi-groupal if it comes equipped with a functor $\mathcal{C} \times \mathcal{C} \to \mathcal{C}$ such that the pair $(A, B) \mapsto A \otimes B$ for $A, B \in \text{ob}(\mathcal{C})$, as well as a collection of natural isomorphisms known as the associativity isomorphisms (or "associators"). These isomorphisms, $a_{X, Y, Z}: X \otimes (Y \otimes Z) \to (X \otimes Y) \otimes Z$, are such that the following "pentagon identity" diagram commutes.

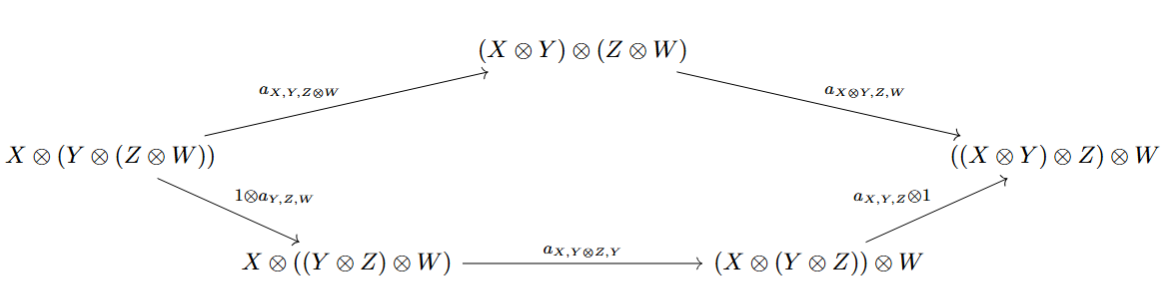
Commutative diagram for associativity isomorphism

== Applications ==
=== In tensor categories ===
A tensor category, or monoidal category, is a semi-groupal category with an identity object, $I$, such that $I \otimes A \cong A$ and $A \otimes I \cong A$. modular tensor categories have many applications in physics, especially in the field of topological quantum field theories.
