= Heinrich Maschke =

German mathematician (1853–1908)

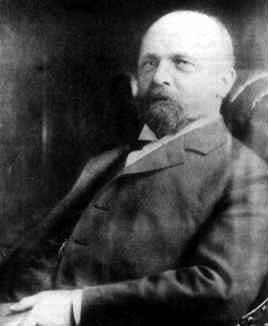
Heinrich Maschke.

Heinrich Maschke (24 October 1853 in Breslau, Germany (now Wrocław, Poland) – 1 March 1908 Chicago, Illinois, USA) was a German mathematician who proved Maschke's theorem.

Maschke earned his Ph.D. degree from the University of Göttingen in 1880. He came to the United States in 1891, and took up an Assistant Professor position at the University of Chicago in 1892.
