= Quantum double model =

In condensed matter physics and quantum information theory, the quantum double model, proposed by Alexei Kitaev, is a lattice model that exhibits topological excitations. This model can be regarded as a lattice gauge theory, and it has applications in many fields, like topological quantum computation, topological order, topological quantum memory, quantum error-correcting code, etc. The name "quantum double" come from the Drinfeld double of a finite groups and Hopf algebras. The most well-known example is the toric code model, which is a special case of quantum double model by setting input group as cyclic group $\mathbb{Z}_2$.

== Kitaev quantum double model ==
The input data for Kitaev quantum double is a finite group $G$. Consider a directed lattice $\Sigma$, we put a Hilbert space $\mathbb{C}[G]$ spanned by group elements on each edge, there are four types of edge operators

$L_+^g|h\rangle =|gh\rangle, L_-^g|h\rangle =|hg^{-1}\rangle,$

$T_+^g|h\rangle =\delta_{g,h}|h\rangle, T_-^g|h\rangle =\delta_{g^{-1},h}|h\rangle.$

For each vertex connecting to $m$ edges $e_1,\ldots,e_m$, there is a vertex operator

$A_v=\frac{1}{|G|}\sum_{g\in G}L^g(e_1)\otimes\ldots\otimes L^g(e_m).$

Notice each edge has an orientation: when $v$ is the starting point of $e_k$, the operator is set as $L_-$, otherwise, it is set as $L_+$.

For each face surrounded by $m$ edges $e_1,\ldots,e_m$, there is a face operator

$B_f=\sum_{h_1\cdots h_m=1_G}\prod_{k=1}^m T^{h_k}(e_k).$

Similar to the vertex operator, due to the orientation of the edge, when face $f$ is on the right-hand side when traversing the positive direction of $e$, we set $T_+$; otherwise, we set $T_{-}$ in the above expression. Also, note that the order of edges surrounding the face is assumed to be counterclockwise.

The lattice Hamiltonian of quantum double model is given by

$H=-\sum_v A_v-\sum_f B_f.$

Both of $A_v$ and $B_f$ are Hermitian projectors, they are stabilizer when regard the model is a quantum error correcting code.

The topological excitations of the model is characterized by the representations of the quantum double of finite group $G$. The anyon types are given by irreducible representations. For the lattice model, the topological excitations are created by ribbon operators.

The gapped boundary theory of quantum double model can be constructed based on subgroups of $G$. There is a boundary-bulk duality for this model.

The topological excitation of the model is equivalent to that of the Levin-Wen string-net model with input given by the representation category of finite group $G$.

== Hopf quantum double model ==
The quantum double model can be generalized to the case where the input data is given by a C* Hopf algebra. In this case, the face and vertex operators are constructed using the comultiplication of Hopf algebra. For each vertex, the Haar integral of the input Hopf algebra is used to construct the vertex operator. For each face, the Haar integral of the dual Hopf algebra of the input Hopf algebra is used to construct the face operator.

The topological excitation are created by ribbon operators.

== Weak Hopf quantum double model ==
A more general case arises when the input data is chosen as a weak Hopf algebra, resulting in the weak Hopf quantum double model.
