= Fusion category =

Mathematical category

In mathematics, a fusion category is a category that is abelian, $k$-linear, semisimple, monoidal, and rigid, and has only finitely many isomorphism classes of simple objects, such that the monoidal unit is simple. If the ground field $k$ is algebraically closed, then the latter is equivalent to $\mathrm{Hom}(1,1)\cong k$ by Schur's lemma.

== Examples ==
The Representation Category of a finite group $G$ of cardinality $n$ over a field $\mathbb K$ is a fusion category if and only if $n$ and the characteristic of $\mathbb K$ are coprime. This is because of the condition of semisimplicity which needs to be checked by the Maschke's theorem.

== Reconstruction ==
- Under Tannaka–Krein duality, every fusion category arises as the representations of a weak Hopf algebra.
- Every fusion category admits a skeletonization, and so a fusion category can be specified simply by specifying the fusion rules of the underlying fusion ring (note that due to Ocneanu Rigidity, this is not a unique specification in general).

== See also ==
- Modular fusion category
- Non-invertible symmetry
- Fusion rules
- Two-dimensional conformal field theory § Fusion rules
- Topological order § Mechanism
