= Center (category theory) =

Variant of the notion of the center of a monoid, group, or ring to a category

In category theory, a branch of mathematics, the center (or Drinfeld center, after Soviet-American mathematician Vladimir Drinfeld) is a variant of the notion of the center of a monoid, group, or ring to a category.

== Definition ==
The center of a monoidal category $\mathcal{C} = (\mathcal{C},\otimes,I)$, denoted $\mathcal{Z(C)}$, is the category whose objects are pairs $(A,u)$ consisting of an object $A$ of $\mathcal{C}$ and an isomorphism $u_X:A \otimes X \rightarrow X \otimes A$ which is natural in $X$ satisfying

$$u_{X \otimes Y} = (1 \otimes u_Y)(u_X \otimes 1)$$

and

$u_I = 1_A$ (this is actually a consequence of the first axiom).

An arrow from $(A,u)$ to $(B,v)$ in $\mathcal{Z(C)}$ consists of an arrow $f\colon A \rightarrow B$ in $\mathcal{C}$ such that

$$v_X (f \otimes 1_X) = (1_X \otimes f) u_X$$.

This definition of the center appears in Joyal & Street (1991). Equivalently, the center may be defined as

$$\mathcal Z(\mathcal C) = \mathrm{End}_{\mathcal C \otimes \mathcal C^{op}}(\mathcal C),$$

i.e., the endofunctors of $\mathcal C$ which are compatible with the left and right action of $\mathcal C$ on itself given by the tensor product.

=== Braiding ===
The category $\mathcal{Z(C)}$ becomes a braided monoidal category with the tensor product on objects defined as

$$(A,u) \otimes (B,v) = (A \otimes B,w)$$

where $w_X = (u_X \otimes 1)(1 \otimes v_X)$, and the obvious braiding.

=== Higher categorical version ===
The categorical center is particularly useful in the context of higher categories. This is illustrated by the following example: the center of the (abelian) category $\mathrm{Mod}_R$ of $R$-modules, for a commutative ring $R$, is $\mathrm{Mod}_R$ again. The center of a monoidal ∞-category $\mathcal C$ can be defined, analogously to the above, as

$$Z(\mathcal C) := \mathrm{End}_{\mathcal C \otimes \mathcal C^{op}}(\mathcal C)$$.

Now, in contrast to the above, the center of the derived category of $R$-modules (regarded as an ∞-category) is given by the derived category of modules over the cochain complex encoding the Hochschild cohomology, a complex whose degree 0 term is $R$ (as in the abelian situation above), but includes higher terms such as $\mathrm{Hom}(R, R)$ (derived Hom).

The notion of a center in this generality is developed by Lurie (2017, §5.3.1). Extending the above-mentioned braiding on the center of an ordinary monoidal category, the center of a monoidal ∞-category becomes an $E_2$-monoidal category. More generally, the center of a $E_k$-monoidal category is an algebra object in $E_k$-monoidal categories and therefore, by Dunn additivity, an $E_{k+1}$-monoidal category.

== Examples ==
Hinich (2007) has shown that the Drinfeld center of the category of sheaves on an orbifold X is the category of sheaves on the inertia orbifold of X. For X being the classifying space of a finite group G, the inertia orbifold is the stack quotient G/G, where G acts on itself by conjugation. For this special case, Hinich's result specializes to the assertion that the center of the category of G-representations (with respect to some ground field k) is equivalent to the category consisting of G-graded k-vector spaces, i.e., objects of the form

$$\bigoplus_{g \in G} V_g$$

for some k-vector spaces, together with G-equivariant morphisms, where G acts on itself by conjugation.

In the same vein, Ben-Zvi, Francis & Nadler (2010) have shown that Drinfeld center of the derived category of quasi-coherent sheaves on a perfect stack X is the derived category of sheaves on the loop stack of X.

== Related notions ==
=== Centers of monoid objects ===
The center of a monoid and the Drinfeld center of a monoidal category are both instances of the following more general concept. Given a monoidal category $\mathcal C$ and a monoid object $A$ in $\mathcal C$, the center of $A$ is defined as

$$Z(A) = \mathrm{End}_{A \otimes A^{\mathrm{op}}}(A).$$

For $\mathcal C$ being the category of sets (with the usual cartesian product), a monoid object is simply a monoid, and $Z(A)$ is the center of the monoid. Similarly, if $\mathcal C$ is the category of abelian groups, monoid objects are rings, and the above recovers the center of a ring. Finally, if $\mathcal C$ is the category of categories, with the product as the monoidal operation, monoid objects in $\mathcal C$ are monoidal categories, and the above recovers the Drinfeld center.

=== Categorical trace ===
The categorical trace of a monoidal category (or monoidal ∞-category) is defined as

$$Tr(C) := C \otimes_{C \otimes C^{op}} C.$$

The concept is being widely applied, for example in Zhu (2018).
