= Maschke's theorem =

Theorem in representation theory

In mathematics, Maschke's theorem, named after Heinrich Maschke, is a theorem in group representation theory that concerns the decomposition of representations of a finite group into irreducible pieces. Maschke's theorem allows one to make general conclusions about representations of a finite group G without actually computing them. It reduces the task of classifying all representations to a more manageable task of classifying irreducible representations, since when the theorem applies, any representation is a direct sum of irreducible pieces (constituents). Moreover, it follows from the Jordan–Hölder theorem that, while the decomposition into a direct sum of irreducible subrepresentations may not be unique, the irreducible pieces have well-defined multiplicities. In particular, a representation of a finite group over a field of characteristic zero is determined up to isomorphism by its character.

== Formulations ==
Maschke's theorem addresses the question: when is a general (finite-dimensional) representation built from irreducible subrepresentations using the direct sum operation? This question (and its answer) are formulated differently for different perspectives on group representation theory.

=== Group-theoretic ===
Maschke's theorem is commonly formulated as a corollary to the following result:

Theorem—Let $V$ be a representation of a finite group $G$ over a field $\mathbb{F}$ with characteristic not dividing the order of $G$. If $V$ has a subrepresentation $W$, then it has another subrepresentation $U$ such that $V=W\oplus U$.

Then the corollary is

Corollary (Maschke's theorem)—Every representation of a finite group $G$ over a field $\mathbb{F}$ with characteristic not dividing the order of $G$ is a direct sum of irreducible representations.

The vector space of complex-valued class functions of a group $G$ has a natural $G$-invariant inner product structure, described in the article Schur orthogonality relations. Maschke's theorem was originally proved for the case of representations over $\Complex$ by constructing $U$ as the orthogonal complement of $W$ under this inner product.

=== Module-theoretic ===
One of the approaches to representations of finite groups is through module theory. Representations of a group $G$ are replaced by modules over its group algebra $K[G]$ (to be precise, there is an isomorphism of categories between $K[G]\text{-Mod}$ and $\operatorname{Rep}_{G}$, the category of representations of $G$). Irreducible representations correspond to simple modules. In the module-theoretic language, Maschke's theorem asks: is an arbitrary module semisimple? In this context, the theorem can be reformulated as follows:

Maschke's Theorem—Let $G$ be a finite group and $K$ a field whose characteristic does not divide the order of $G$. Then $K[G]$, the group algebra of $G$, is semisimple.

The importance of this result stems from the well developed theory of semisimple rings, in particular, their classification as given by the Wedderburn–Artin theorem. When $K$ is the field of complex numbers, this shows that the algebra $K[G]$ is a product of several copies of complex matrix algebras, one for each irreducible representation. If the field $K$ has characteristic zero, but is not algebraically closed, for example if $K$ is the field of real or rational numbers, then a somewhat more complicated statement holds: the group algebra $K[G]$ is a product of matrix algebras over division rings over $K$. The summands correspond to irreducible representations of $G$ over $K$.

=== Category-theoretic ===
Reformulated in the language of semi-simple categories, Maschke's theorem states

Maschke's theorem—If G is a group and F is a field with characteristic not dividing the order of G, then the category of representations of G over F is semi-simple.

== Proofs ==
=== Group-theoretic ===
Let U be a subspace of V complement of W. Let $p_0 : V \to W$ be the projection function, i.e., $p_0(w + u) = w$ for any $u \in U, w \in W$.

Define $p(x) = \frac{1}{\#G} \sum_{g \in G} g \cdot p_0 \cdot g^{-1} (x)$, where $g \cdot p_0 \cdot g^{-1}$ is an abbreviation of $\rho_W{g} \cdot p_0 \cdot \rho_V{g^{-1}}$, with $\rho_W{g}, \rho_V{g^{-1}}$ being the representation of G on W and V. Then, $\ker p$ is preserved by G under representation $\rho_V$: for any $w' \in \ker p, h \in G$,
$$\begin{align}
p(hw') &= h \cdot h^{-1} \frac{1}{\#G} \sum_{g \in G} g \cdot p_0 \cdot g^{-1} (hw') \\
&= h \cdot \frac{1}{\#G} \sum_{g \in G} (h^{-1} \cdot g) \cdot p_0 \cdot (g^{-1} h) w' \\
&= h \cdot \frac{1}{\#G} \sum_{g \in G} g \cdot p_0 \cdot g^{-1} w' \\
&= h \cdot p(w') \\
&= 0
\end{align}$$

so $w' \in \ker p$ implies that $hw' \in \ker p$. So the restriction of $\rho_V$ on $\ker p$ is also a representation.

By the definition of $p$, for any $w \in W$, $p(w) = w$, so $W \cap \ker\ p = \{0\}$, and for any $v \in V$, $p(p(v)) = p(v)$. Thus, $p(v-p(v)) = 0$, and $v - p(v) \in \ker p$. Therefore, $V = W \oplus \ker p$.

=== Module-theoretic ===
Let V be a K[G]-submodule. We will prove that V is a direct summand. Let π be any K-linear projection of K[G] onto V. Consider the map
$$\begin{cases}
\varphi:K[G]\to V \\
\varphi:x \mapsto \frac{1}{\#G}\sum_{s \in G} s\cdot \pi(s^{-1} \cdot x)
\end{cases}$$

Then φ is again a projection: it is clearly K-linear, maps K[G] to V, and induces the identity on V (therefore, maps K[G] onto V). Moreover we have

$$\begin{align}
\varphi(t\cdot x) &= \frac{1}{\#G}\sum_{s \in G} s\cdot \pi(s^{-1}\cdot t\cdot x)\\
&= \frac{1}{\#G}\sum_{u \in G} t\cdot u\cdot \pi(u^{-1}\cdot x)\\
&= t\cdot\varphi(x),
\end{align}$$

so φ is in fact K[G]-linear. By the splitting lemma, $K[G]=V \oplus \ker \varphi$. This proves that every submodule is a direct summand, that is, K[G] is semisimple.

== Converse statement ==
The above proof depends on the fact that #G is invertible in K. This might lead one to ask if the converse of Maschke's theorem also holds: if the characteristic of K divides the order of G, does it follow that K[G] is not semisimple? The answer is yes.

Proof. For $x = \sum\lambda_g g\in K[G]$ define $\epsilon(x) = \sum\lambda_g$. Let $I=\ker\epsilon$. Then I is a K[G]-submodule. We will prove that for every nontrivial submodule V of K[G], $I \cap V \neq 0$. Let V be given, and let $v=\sum\mu_gg$ be any nonzero element of V. If $\epsilon(v)=0$, the claim is immediate. Otherwise, let $s = \sum 1 g$. Then $\epsilon(s) = \#G \cdot 1 = 0$ so $s \in I$ and
$$sv = \left(\sum1g\right)\!\left(\sum\mu_gg\right) = \sum\epsilon(v)g = \epsilon(v)s$$

so that $sv$ is a nonzero element of both I and V. This proves V is not a direct complement of I for all V, so K[G] is not semisimple.

== Non-examples ==
The theorem can not apply to the case where G is infinite, or when the field K has characteristics dividing #G. For example,

- Consider the infinite group $\mathbb{Z}$ and the representation $\rho: \mathbb{Z} \to \mathrm{GL}_2(\Complex)$ defined by
  $$\rho(n) = \begin{bmatrix} 1 & 1 \\ 0 & 1 \end{bmatrix}^n = \begin{bmatrix} 1 & n \\ 0 & 1 \end{bmatrix}$$
  . Let
  $$W = \Complex \cdot \begin{bmatrix} 1  \\ 0 \end{bmatrix}$$
  , a 1-dimensional subspace of $\Complex^2$ spanned by
  $$\begin{bmatrix} 1  \\ 0 \end{bmatrix}$$
  . Then the restriction of $\rho$ on W is a trivial subrepresentation of $\mathbb{Z}$. However, there's no U such that both W, U are subrepresentations of $\mathbb{Z}$ and $\Complex^2 = W \oplus U$: any such U needs to be 1-dimensional, but any 1-dimensional subspace preserved by $\rho$ has to be spanned by an eigenvector for
  $$\begin{bmatrix} 1 & 1 \\ 0 & 1 \end{bmatrix}$$
  , and the only eigenvector for that is
  $$\begin{bmatrix} 1 \\ 0 \end{bmatrix}$$.
- Consider a prime p, and the group $\mathbb{Z}/p\mathbb{Z}$, field $K = \mathbb{F}_p$, and the representation $\rho: \mathbb{Z}/p\mathbb{Z} \to \mathrm{GL}_2(\mathbb{F}_p)$ defined by
  $$\rho(n) = \begin{bmatrix} 1 & n \\ 0 & 1 \end{bmatrix}$$
  . Simple calculations show that there is only one eigenvector for
  $$\begin{bmatrix} 1 & 1 \\ 0 & 1 \end{bmatrix}$$
  here, so by the same argument, the 1-dimensional subrepresentation of $\mathbb{Z}/p\mathbb{Z}$ is unique, and $\mathbb{Z}/p\mathbb{Z}$ cannot be decomposed into the direct sum of two 1-dimensional subrepresentations.
