= Ribbon category =

In mathematics, a ribbon category, also called a tortile category, is a particular type of braided monoidal category.

== Definition ==
A monoidal category $\mathcal C$ is, loosely speaking, a category equipped with a notion resembling the tensor product (of vector spaces, say). That is, for any two objects $C_1, C_2 \in \mathcal C$, there is an object $C_1 \otimes C_2 \in \mathcal C$. The assignment $C_1, C_2 \mapsto C_1 \otimes C_2$ is supposed to be functorial and needs to require a number of further properties such as a unit object 1 and an associativity isomorphism. Such a category is called braided if there are isomorphisms

$$c_{C_1, C_2}: C_1 \otimes C_2 \stackrel \cong \rightarrow C_2 \otimes C_1.$$

A braided monoidal category is called a ribbon category if the category is left rigid and has a family of twists. The former means that for each object $C$ there is another object (called the left dual), $C^*$, with maps

$$1 \rightarrow C \otimes C^*, C^* \otimes C \rightarrow 1$$

such that the compositions

$$C^* \cong C^* \otimes 1 \rightarrow C^* \otimes (C \otimes C^*) \cong (C^* \otimes C) \otimes C^* \rightarrow 1 \otimes C^* \cong C^*$$

equals the identity of $C^*$, and similarly with $C$. The twists are maps

$C \in \mathcal C$, $\theta_C : C \rightarrow C$

such that

$$\begin{align}
\theta_{C_1 \otimes C_2} &= c_{C_2, C_1} c_{C_1, C_2} (\theta_{C_1}  \otimes \theta_{C_2})\\
\theta_1 &= \mathrm{id}\\
\theta_{C^*} & = (\theta_C)^*.
\end{align}$$

To be a ribbon category, the duals have to be thus compatible with the braiding and the twists.

=== Concrete Example ===
Consider the category $\mathbf{FdVect}(\mathbb{C})$ of finite-dimensional vector spaces over $\mathbb{C}$. Suppose that $C$ is such a vector space, spanned by the basis vectors $\hat{e_1}, \hat{e_2},\cdots,\hat{e_n}$. We assign to $C$ the dual object $C^\dagger$ spanned by the basis vectors $\hat{e}^1, \hat{e}^2,\cdots,\hat{e}^n$. Then let us define

$$\begin{align}
\cdot: \ C^\dagger\otimes C &\to 1\\
\hat{e}^i\cdot\hat{e_j} &\mapsto \begin{cases} 1 & i=j \\ 0 & i\neq j \end{cases}
\end{align}$$

and its dual

$$\begin{align}
k I_n:  1& \to C\otimes C^\dagger\\
k &\mapsto k \sum_{i=1}^n \hat{e_i}\otimes \hat{e}^i\\
&= \begin{pmatrix}k & 0 & \cdots & 0\\ 0 & k & &\vdots \\ &&\ddots&\\0&\cdots &&k\end{pmatrix}
\end{align}$$

(which largely amounts to assigning a given $\hat{e_i}$ the dual $\hat{e}^i$).

Then indeed we find that (for example)

$$\begin{align}
\hat{e}^i &\cong \hat{e}^i\otimes 1 \\
&\underset{I_n}{\to} \hat{e}^i \otimes \sum_{j=1}^n \hat{e_j}\otimes \hat{e}^j\\
&\cong \sum_{j=1}^n \left(\hat{e}^i \otimes \hat{e_j}\right)\otimes \hat{e}^j\\
&\underset{\cdot}{\to} \sum_{j=1}^n \begin{cases} 1 \otimes \hat{e}^j & i=j \\ 0 \otimes \hat{e}^j & i\neq j \end{cases}\\
&= 1\otimes \hat{e}^i \cong \hat{e}^i
\end{align}$$

and similarly for $\hat{e_i}$. Since this proof applies to any finite-dimensional vector space, we have shown that our structure over $\mathbf{FdVect}$ defines a (left) rigid monoidal category.

Then, we must define braids and twists in such a way that they are compatible. In this case, this largely makes one determined given the other on the reals. For example, if we take the trivial braiding

$$\begin{align}
c_{C_1,C_2}: C_1 \otimes C_2 &\to C_2 \otimes C_1\\
c_{C_1, C_2} (a, b) &\mapsto (b, a)
\end{align}$$

then $c_{C_1, C_2} c_{C_2, C_1}=\mathrm{id}_{C_1\otimes C_2}$, so our twist must obey $\theta_{C_1 \otimes C_2} = \theta_{C_1} \otimes \theta_{C_2}$. In other words it must operate elementwise across tensor products. But any object $C\in\mathbf{FdVect}$ can be written in the form $C=\bigotimes_{i=1}^n 1$ for some $n$, $\theta_C=\bigotimes_{i=1}^n \theta_1 = \bigotimes_{i=1}^n \mathrm{id} = \mathrm{id}_C$, so our twists must also be trivial.

On the other hand, we can introduce any nonzero multiplicative factor into the above braiding rule without breaking isomorphism (at least in $\mathbb{C}$). Let us for example take the braiding

$$\begin{align}
c_{C_1,C_2}: C_1 \otimes C_2 &\to C_2 \otimes C_1\\
c_{C_1, C_2} (a, b) &\mapsto i (b, a)
\end{align}$$

Then $c_{C_1, C_2} c_{C_2, C_1}=-\mathrm{id}_{C_1\otimes C_2}$. Since $\theta_1 = \mathrm{id}$, then $\theta_{1 \otimes 1} = -\mathrm{id}_{1\otimes 1}$; by induction, if $C$ is $n$-dimensional, then $\theta_C = (-1)^{n+1} \mathrm{id}_C$.

=== Other Examples ===
- The category of projective modules over a commutative ring. In this category, the monoidal structure is the tensor product, the dual object is the dual in the sense of (linear) algebra, which is again projective. The twists in this case are the identity maps.
- A more sophisticated example of a ribbon category are finite-dimensional representations of a quantum group.

The name ribbon category is motivated by a graphical depiction of morphisms.

== Variant ==
A strongly ribbon category is a ribbon category C equipped with a dagger structure such that the functor †: C^{op} → C coherently preserves the ribbon structure.
