= Weak Hopf algebra =

In mathematics, weak bi-algebras are a generalization of bialgebras that are both algebras and coalgebras but for which the compatibility conditions between the two structures have been "weakened". In the same spirit, weak Hopf algebras are weak bialgebras together with a linear map S satisfying specific conditions; they are generalizations of Hopf algebras.

These objects were introduced by Böhm, Nill and Szlachányi. The first motivations for studying them came from quantum field theory and operator algebras. Weak Hopf algebras have quite interesting representation theory; in particular modules over a semisimple finite weak Hopf algebra is a fusion category (which is a monoidal category with extra properties). It was also shown by Etingof, Nikshych and Ostrik that any fusion category is equivalent to a category of modules over a weak Hopf algebra.

== Definition ==
A weak bialgebra $(H, \mu, \eta, \Delta, \varepsilon)$ over a field $k$ is a vector space $H$ such that

- $(H, \mu, \eta)$ forms an associative algebra with multiplication $\mu : H \otimes H \rightarrow H$ and unit $\eta : k \rightarrow H$,
- $(H, \Delta, \varepsilon)$ forms a coassociative coalgebra with comultiplication $\Delta : H \rightarrow H \otimes H$ and counit $\varepsilon : H \rightarrow k$,

for which the following compatibility conditions hold :

1. Multiplicativity of the Comultiplication :
  $$\Delta \circ \mu = (\mu \otimes \mu) \circ (\mathrm{id}_H \otimes \sigma_{H, H} \otimes \mathrm{id}_H) \circ (\Delta \otimes \Delta)$$,
2. Weak Multiplicativity of the Counit :
  $$\varepsilon \circ \mu \circ (\mu \otimes \mathrm{id}_H)  = (\varepsilon \otimes \varepsilon ) \circ (\mu \otimes \mu) \circ (\mathrm{id}_H \otimes \Delta \otimes \mathrm{id}_H)= (\varepsilon \otimes \varepsilon ) \circ (\mu \otimes \mu) \circ (\mathrm{id}_H \otimes \Delta^{op} \otimes \mathrm{id}_H)$$,
3. Weak Comultiplicativity of the Unit :
  $$(\Delta \otimes \mathrm{id}_H) \circ \Delta \circ \eta   = (\mathrm{id}_H \otimes \mu \otimes \mathrm{id}_H) \circ (\Delta \otimes \Delta) \circ (\eta \otimes \eta) = (\mathrm{id}_H \otimes \mu^{op} \otimes \mathrm{id}_H) \circ (\Delta \otimes \Delta) \circ (\eta \otimes \eta)$$,

where $\sigma_{V, W} : V \otimes W \rightarrow W \otimes V : v \otimes w \mapsto w \otimes v$ flips the two tensor factors. Moreover $\mu^{op} = \mu \circ \sigma_{H,H}$ is the opposite multiplication and $\Delta^{op} = \sigma_{H, H} \circ \Delta$ is the opposite comultiplication. Note that we also implicitly use Mac Lane's coherence theorem for the monoidal category of vector spaces, identifying $(U \otimes V) \otimes W \cong U \otimes (V \otimes W)$ as well as $V \otimes k \cong V \cong k \otimes V$.

The definition weakens the compatibility between the algebra and coalgebra structures of a bialgebra. More specifically, the unit and counit are weakened. This remains true in the axioms of a weak Hopf algebra.

A weak Hopf algebra $(H, \mu, \eta, \Delta, \varepsilon, S)$ is a weak bialgebra $(H, \mu, \eta, \Delta, \varepsilon)$ with a linear map $S : H \to H$, called the antipode, that satisfies:

- $\mu \circ (\mathrm{id}_H \otimes S) \circ \Delta = (\varepsilon \otimes \mathrm{id}_H) \circ (\mu \otimes \mathrm{id}_H) \circ (\mathrm{id}_H \otimes \sigma_{H, H}) \circ (\Delta \otimes \mathrm{id}_H) \circ (\eta \otimes \mathrm{id}_H)$,
- $\mu \circ (S \otimes \mathrm{id}_H) \circ \Delta = (\mathrm{id}_H \otimes \varepsilon) \circ (\mathrm{id}_H \otimes \mu) \circ (\sigma_{H, H} \otimes \mathrm{id}_H) \circ (\mathrm{id}_H \otimes \Delta) \circ (\mathrm{id}_H \otimes \eta)$,
- $S = \mu \circ (\mu \otimes \mathrm{id}_H) \circ (S \otimes \mathrm{id}_H \otimes S) \circ (\Delta \otimes \mathrm{id}_H) \circ \Delta$.

== Examples ==
1. Hopf algebra. Of course any Hopf algebra is a weak Hopf algebra.
2. Groupoid algebra. Suppose $G = (G_0, G_1)$ is a groupoid and let $K[G]$ be the groupoid algebra, in other words, the algebra generated by the morphisms $g \in G_1$. This becomes a weak Hopf algebra if we define
  - $\mu : K[G] \otimes K[G] \to K[G] ~\text{by}~ \mu(g \otimes h)= \left\{ \begin{array}{cl} g \circ h & \text{if target(h) = source(g)} \\ 0 & \text{otherwise} \end{array} \right.$
  - $\eta : k \to K[G] ~\text{by}~ \eta (1) = \sum_{X \in G_0} \mathrm{id}_X$
  - $\Delta : K[G] \to K[G] \otimes K[G] ~\text{by}~ \Delta(g) = g \otimes g ~ \text{for all} ~g \in G_1$
  - $\varepsilon : K[G] \to k ~\text{by}~ \varepsilon(g) = 1 ~\text{for all}~ g \in G_1$
  - $S : K[G] \to K[G] ~\text{by}~ S(g) = g^{-1} ~\text{for all}~ g \in G_1$.

Note that this second example is a weak Hopf algebra but not a Hopf algebra, whenever $G_0$ is not a singleton.

== Representation theory ==
Let H be a semisimple finite weak Hopf algebra, then modules over H form a semisimple rigid monoidal category with finitely many simple objects. Moreover the homomorphisms spaces are finite-dimensional vector spaces and the endomorphisms space of simple objects are one-dimensional. Finally, the monoidal unit is a simple object. Such a category is called a fusion category.

It can be shown that some monoidal category are not modules over a Hopf algebra. In the case of fusion categories (which are just monoidal categories with extra conditions), it was proved by Etingof, Nikshych and Ostrik that any fusion category is equivalent to a category of modules over a weak Hopf algebra.
