= Modular group representation =

Representation of a modular tensor category

In mathematics, the modular group representation (or simply modular representation) of a modular tensor category $\mathcal{C}$ is a representation of the modular group $\text{SL}_2(\mathbb{Z})$ associated to $\mathcal{C}$. It is from the existence of the modular representation that modular tensor categories get their name.

From the perspective of topological quantum field theory, the modular representation of $\mathcal{C}$ arrises naturally as the representation of the mapping class group of the torus associated to the Reshetikhin–Turaev topological quantum field theory associated to $\mathcal{C}$. As such, modular tensor categories can be used to define projective representations of the mapping class groups of all closed surfaces.

== Construction ==
Associated to every modular tensor category $\mathcal{C}$, it is a theorem that there is a finite-dimensional unitary representation $\rho_{\mathcal{C}}: \text{SL}_2(\mathbb{Z}) \to U(\mathbb{C}[\mathcal{L}])$ where $\text{SL}_2(\mathbb{Z})$ is the group of 2-by-2 invertible integer matrices, $\mathbb{C}[\mathcal{L}]$ is a vector space with a formal basis given by elements of the set $\mathcal{L}$ of isomorphism classes of simple objects, and $U(\mathbb{C}[\mathcal{L}])$ denotes the space of unitary operators $\mathbb{C}[\mathcal{L}]$ relative to Hilbert space structure induced by the canonical basis. Seeing as $\text{SL}_2(\mathbb{Z})$ is sometimes referred to as the modular group, this representation is referred to as the modular representation of $\mathcal{C}$. It is for this reason that modular tensor categories are called 'modular'.

There is a standard presentation of $\text{SL}_2(\mathbb{Z})$, given by $\text{SL}_2( \mathbb{Z} ) = <\left. s , t \right| s^4 = 1 , \, \, (st)^3 = s^2>$. Thus, to define a representation of $\text{SL}_2(\mathbb{Z})$ it is sufficient to define the action of the matrices $s,t$ and to show that these actions are invertible and satisfy the relations in the presentation. To this end, it is customary to define matrices $S,T$ called the modular $S$ and $T$ matrices. The entries of the matrices are labeled by pairs $([A],[B])\in \mathcal{L}^2$. The modular $T$-matrix is defined to be a diagonal matrix whose $([A],[A])$-entry is the $\theta$-symbol $\theta_A$. The $([A],[B])$ entry of the modular $S$-matrix is defined in terms of the braiding, as shown below (note that naively this formula defines $S_{A,B}$ as a morphism ${\bf 1} \to {\bf 1}$, which can then be identified with a complex number since $\bf 1$ is a simple object).

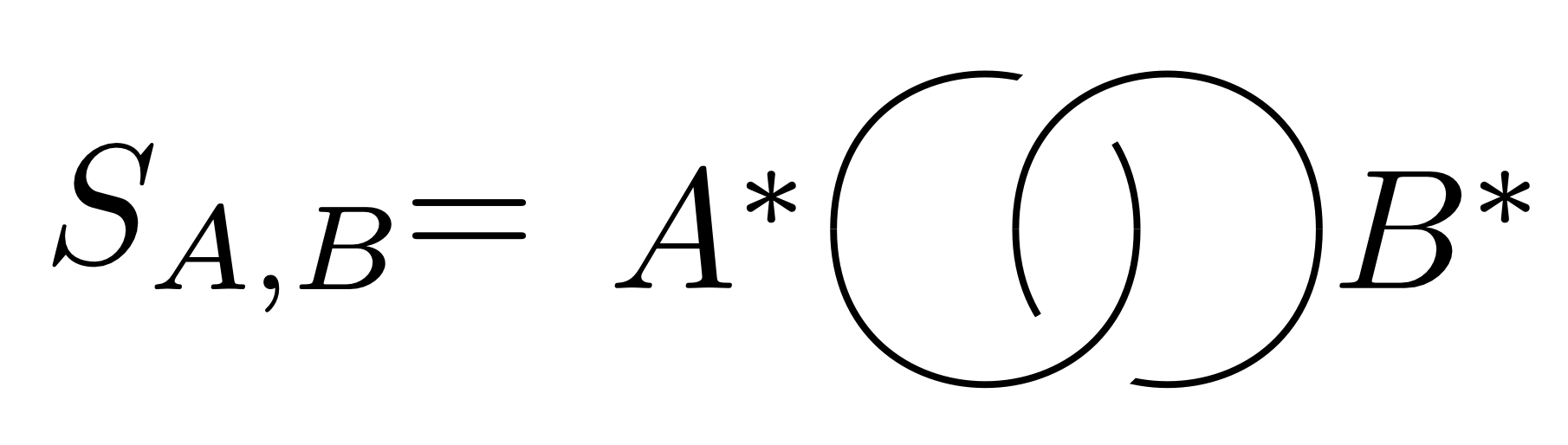
Definition of S-matrix entries.

The modular $S$ and $T$ matrices do not immediately give a representation of $\text{SL}_2(\mathbb{Z})$ - they only give a projective representation. This can be fixed by shifting $S$ and $T$ by certain scalars. Namely, defining $\rho_{\mathcal{C}}(s) = (1/\mathcal{D}) \cdot S$ and $\rho_{\mathcal{C}}(t)= (p_{\mathcal{C}}^-/p_{\mathcal{C}}^+)^{1/6} \cdot T$ defines a proper modular representation, where $\mathcal{D}^2=\sum_{[A]\in\mathcal{L}}d_{A}^2$ is the global quantum dimension of $\mathcal{C}$ and $p_{\mathcal{C}}^-, \, \, p_{\mathcal{C}}^+$ are the Gauss sums associated to $\mathcal{C}$, where in both these formulas $d_{A}$ are the quantum dimensions of the simple objects.

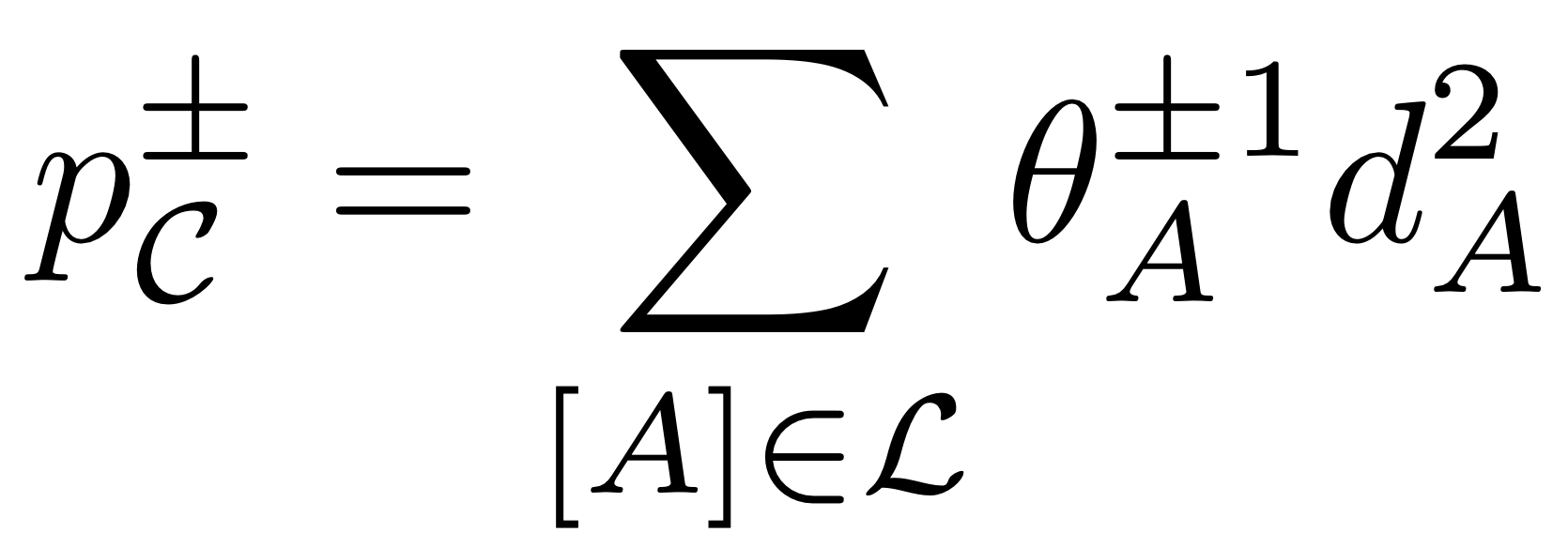
Formula for the Gauss sums of a modular tensor category.

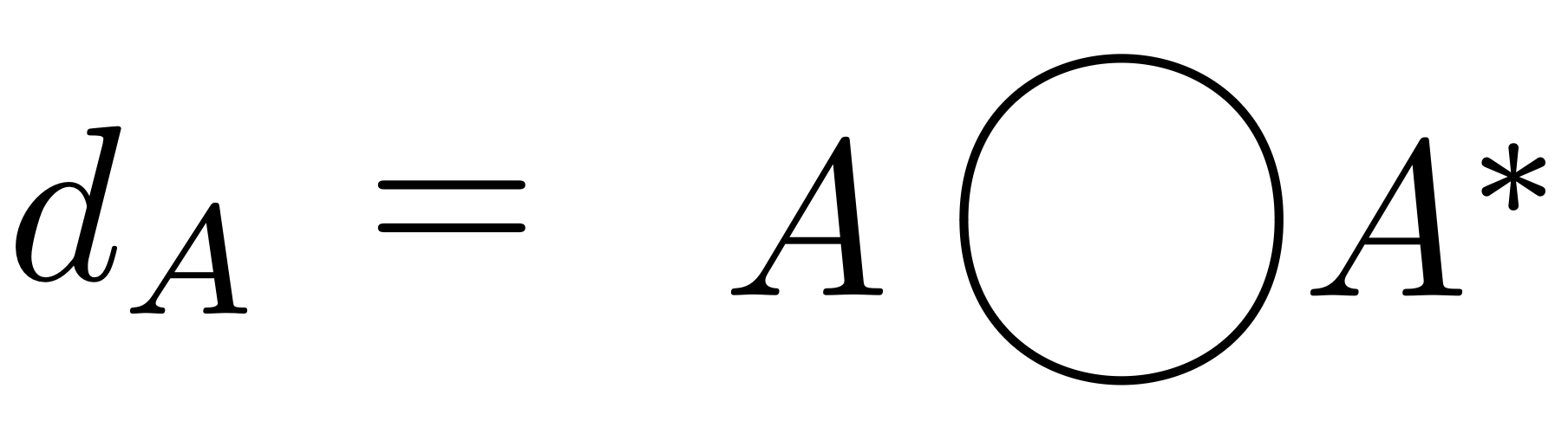
Formula for the quantum dimension of a simple object.
