= Semi-simplicity =

Mathematical property

In mathematics, semi-simplicity is a widespread concept in disciplines such as linear algebra, abstract algebra, representation theory, category theory, and algebraic geometry. A semi-simple object is one that can be decomposed into a sum of simple objects, and simple objects are those that do not contain non-trivial proper sub-objects. The precise definitions of these words depends on the context.

For example, if G is a finite group, then a nontrivial finite-dimensional representation V over a field is said to be simple if the only subrepresentations it contains are either {0} or V (these are also called irreducible representations). Now Maschke's theorem says that any finite-dimensional representation of a finite group is a direct sum of simple representations (provided the characteristic of the base field does not divide the order of the group). So in the case of finite groups with this condition, every finite-dimensional representation is semi-simple. Especially in algebra and representation theory, "semi-simplicity" is also called complete reducibility. For example, Weyl's theorem on complete reducibility says a finite-dimensional representation of a semisimple compact Lie group is semisimple.

A square matrix (in other words a linear operator $T:V \to V$ with V a finite-dimensional vector space) is said to be simple if its only invariant linear subspaces under T are {0} and V. If the field is algebraically closed (such as the complex numbers), then the only simple matrices are of size 1-by-1. A semi-simple matrix is one that is similar to a direct sum of simple matrices; if the field is algebraically closed, this is the same as being diagonalizable.

These notions of semi-simplicity can be unified using the language of semi-simple modules, and generalized to semi-simple categories.

== Introductory example of vector spaces ==
If one considers all vector spaces (over a field, such as the real numbers), the simple vector spaces are those that contain no proper nontrivial subspaces. Therefore, the one-dimensional vector spaces are the simple ones. So it is a basic result of linear algebra that any finite-dimensional vector space is the direct sum of simple vector spaces; in other words, all finite-dimensional vector spaces are semi-simple.

== Semi-simple matrices ==
A square matrix or, equivalently, a linear operator T on a finite-dimensional vector space V is called semi-simple if every T-invariant subspace has a complementary T-invariant subspace. This is equivalent to the minimal polynomial of T being square-free.

For vector spaces over an algebraically closed field F, semi-simplicity of a matrix is equivalent to diagonalizability. This is because such an operator always has an eigenvector; if it is, in addition, semi-simple, then it has a complementary invariant hyperplane, which itself has an eigenvector, and thus by induction is diagonalizable. Conversely, diagonalizable operators are easily seen to be semi-simple, as invariant subspaces are direct sums of eigenspaces, and any eigenbasis for this subspace can be extended to an eigenbasis of the full space.

== Semi-simple modules and rings ==
For a fixed ring R, a nontrivial R-module M is simple, if it has no submodules other than 0 and M. An R-module M is semi-simple if every R-submodule of M is an R-module direct summand of M (the trivial module 0 is semi-simple, but not simple). For an R-module M, M is semi-simple if and only if it is the direct sum of simple modules (the trivial module is the empty direct sum). Finally, R is called a semi-simple ring if it is semi-simple as an R-module. As it turns out, this is equivalent to requiring that any finitely generated R-module M is semi-simple.

Examples of semi-simple rings include fields and, more generally, finite direct products of fields. For a finite group G Maschke's theorem asserts that the group ring R[G] over some ring R is semi-simple if and only if R is semi-simple and |G| is invertible in R. Since the theory of modules of R[G] is the same as the representation theory of G on R-modules, this fact is an important dichotomy, which causes modular representation theory, i.e., the case when |G| does divide the characteristic of R to be more difficult than the case when |G| does not divide the characteristic, in particular if R is a field of characteristic zero. By the Artin–Wedderburn theorem, a unital Artinian ring R is semisimple if and only if it is (isomorphic to) $M_{n_1}(D_1) \times M_{n_2}(D_2) \times \cdots \times M_{n_r}(D_r)$, where each $D_i$ is a division ring and $M_n(D)$ is the ring of n-by-n matrices with entries in D.

An operator T is semi-simple in the sense above if and only if the subalgebra $F[T] \subseteq \operatorname{End}_F(V)$ generated by the powers (i.e., iterations) of T inside the ring of endomorphisms of V is semi-simple.

As indicated above, the theory of semi-simple rings is much more easy than the one of general rings. For example, any short exact sequence

$$0 \to M' \to M \to M'' \to 0$$

of modules over a semi-simple ring must split, i.e., $M \cong M' \oplus M''$. From the point of view of homological algebra, this means that there are no non-trivial extensions. The ring Z of integers is not semi-simple: Z is not the direct sum of nZ and Z/n.

== Semi-simple categories ==
Many of the above notions of semi-simplicity are recovered by the concept of a semi-simple category C. Briefly, a category is a collection of objects and maps between such objects, the idea being that the maps between the objects preserve some structure inherent in these objects. For example, R-modules and R-linear maps between them form a category, for any ring R.

An abelian category C is called semi-simple if there is a collection of simple objects $X_\alpha \in C$, i.e., ones with no subobject other than the zero object 0 and $X_\alpha$ itself, such that any object X is the direct sum (i.e., coproduct or, equivalently, product) of finitely many simple objects. It follows from Schur's lemma that the endomorphism ring

$$\operatorname{End}_C(X)=\operatorname{Hom}_C(X, X)$$

in a semi-simple category is a product of matrix rings over division rings, i.e., semi-simple.

Moreover, a ring R is semi-simple if and only if the category of finitely generated R-modules is semisimple.

An example from Hodge theory is the category of polarizable pure Hodge structures, i.e., pure Hodge structures equipped with a suitable positive definite bilinear form. The presence of this so-called polarization causes the category of polarizable Hodge structures to be semi-simple. Another example from algebraic geometry is the category of pure motives of smooth projective varieties over a field k $\operatorname{Mot}(k)_\sim$ modulo an adequate equivalence relation $\sim$. As was conjectured by Grothendieck and shown by Jannsen, this category is semi-simple if and only if the equivalence relation is numerical equivalence. This fact is a conceptual cornerstone in the theory of motives.

Semisimple abelian categories also arise from a combination of a t-structure and a (suitably related) weight structure on a triangulated category.

== Semi-simplicity in representation theory ==
One can ask whether the category of finite-dimensional representations of a group or a Lie algebra is semisimple, that is, whether every finite-dimensional representation decomposes as a direct sum of irreducible representations. The answer, in general, is no. For example, the representation of $\mathbb{R}$ given by

$$\Pi(x)=\begin{pmatrix}
1 & x\\
0 & 1
\end{pmatrix}$$

is not a direct sum of irreducibles. (There is precisely one nontrivial invariant subspace, the span of the first basis element, $e_1$.) On the other hand, if $G$ is compact, then every finite-dimensional representation $\Pi$ of $G$ admits an inner product with respect to which $\Pi$ is unitary, showing that $\Pi$ decomposes as a sum of irreducibles. Similarly, if $\mathfrak{g}$ is a complex semisimple Lie algebra, every finite-dimensional representation of $\mathfrak{g}$ is a sum of irreducibles. Weyl's original proof of this used the unitarian trick: Every such $\mathfrak{g}$ is the complexification of the Lie algebra of a simply connected compact Lie group $K$. Since $K$ is simply connected, there is a one-to-one correspondence between the finite-dimensional representations of $K$ and of $\mathfrak{g}$. Thus, the just-mentioned result about representations of compact groups applies. It is also possible to prove semisimplicity of representations of $\mathfrak{g}$ directly by algebraic means, as in Section 10.3 of Hall's book.

See also: Fusion category (which are semisimple).

== See also ==
- A semisimple Lie algebra is a Lie algebra that is a direct sum of simple Lie algebras.
- A semisimple algebraic group is a linear algebraic group whose radical of the identity component is trivial.
- Semisimple algebra
- Semisimple representation
