= Rational conformal field theory =

Class of conformal field theories

In theoretical physics, a rational conformal field theory is a special type of two-dimensional conformal field theory with a finite number of conformal primaries. In these theories, all dimensions (and the central charge) are rational numbers that can be computed from the consistency conditions of conformal field theory. The most famous examples are the so-called minimal models.

More generally, rational conformal field theory can refer to any CFT with a finite number of primary operators with respect to the action of its chiral algebra. Chiral algebras can be much larger than the Virasoro algebra. Well-known examples include (the enveloping algebra of) affine Lie algebras, relevant to the Wess–Zumino–Witten model, and W-algebras.
