= Fusion of anyons =

Anyon fusion is the process by which multiple anyons behave as one larger composite anyon. Anyon fusion is essential to understanding the physics of non-abelian anyons and how they can be used in quantum information.

== Abelian anyons ==
If $N$ identical abelian anyons each with individual statistics $\alpha$ (that is, the system picks up a phase $e^{i \alpha}$ when two individual anyons undergo adiabatic counterclockwise exchange) all fuse together, they together have statistics $N^2 \alpha$. This can be seen by noting that upon counterclockwise rotation of two composite anyons about each other, there are $N^2$ pairs of individual anyons (one in the first composite anyon, one in the second composite anyon) that each contribute a phase $e^{i \alpha}$. An analogous analysis applies to the fusion of non-identical abelian anyons. The statistics of the composite anyon is uniquely determined by the statistics of its components.

== Non-abelian anyon fusion rules ==
Non-abelian anyons have more complicated fusion relations. As a rule, in a system with non-abelian anyons, there is a composite particle whose statistics label is not uniquely determined by the statistics labels of its components, but rather exists as a quantum superposition (this is completely analogous to how two fermions known to each have spin 1/2 and 3/2 are together in quantum superposition of total spin 1 and 2). If the overall statistics of the fusion of all of several anyons is known, there is still ambiguity in the fusion of some subsets of those anyons, and each possibility is a unique quantum state. These multiple states provide a Hilbert space on which quantum computation can be done.

Specifically, two non-abelian anyons labeled $a$ and $b$ have a fusion rule given by $a \times b = \sum_c N^c_{ab} c$, where the formal sum over $c$ goes over all labels of possible anyon types in the system (as well as the trivial label $c = 1$ denoting no particles), and each $N^c_{ab}$ is a nonnegative integer which denotes how many distinct quantum states there are in which $a$ and $b$ fuse into $c$ (This is true in the abelian case as well, except in that case, for each $a$ and $b$, there is one type of anyon $c$ for which $N^c_{ab}=1$ and for all other $c$, $N^c_{ab}=0$ .) Each anyon type $a$ should also have a conjugate antiparticle $\bar{a}$ among the list of possible anyon types, such that $N^1_{a \bar{a}} \neq 0$, i.e. it can annihilate with its antiparticle. The anyon type label does not specify all of the information about the anyon, but the information that it does indicate is topologically invariant under local perturbations.

For example, the Fibonacci anyon system, one of the simplest, consists of labels $1$ and $\tau$ ($\tau$ denotes a Fibonacci anyon), which satisfy fusion rule $\tau \times \tau = 1 + \tau$ (corresponding to $N^{\tau}_{\tau \tau}=N^{1}_{\tau \tau} = 1$) as well as the trivial rules $\tau \times 1= \tau$ and $1 \times 1 = 1$ (corresponding to $N^{\tau}_{\tau 1}=N^{1}_{1 1} = 1$).

The Ising anyon system consists of labels $1$ , $\psi$ and $\sigma$ , which satisfy fusion rules $\sigma \times \sigma = 1 + \psi$, $\sigma \times \psi= \sigma$, and the trivial rules.

The $\times$ operation is commutative and associative, as it must be to physically make sense with fused anyons. Furthermore, it is possible to view the $N^c_{ab}$ coefficients as matrix entries $(N_a)^c_b$ of a matrix with row and column indices $b$ and $c$; then the largest eigenvalue of this matrix is known as the quantum dimension $d_a$ of anyon type $a$.

Fusion rules can also be generalized to consider in how many ways $N^{c}_{a_1, a_2, \ldots a_m}$ a collection $a_1, a_2, \ldots a_m$ can be fused to a final anyon type $c$.

== Hilbert spaces of fusion processes ==
The fusion process where $a$ and $b$ fuse into $c$ corresponds to a $N^c_{ab}$ dimensional complex vector space $V^c_{ab}$, consisting of all the distinct orthonormal quantum states in which $a$ and $b$ fuse into $c$. This forms a Hilbert space. When $N^c_{ab} \le 1$, such as in the Ising and Fibonacci examples, $V^c_{ab}$ is at most just a one dimensional space with one state. The direct sum $\bigoplus_c V^c_{ab}$ is a decomposition of $\mathcal{H}_a \otimes \mathcal{H}_b$ the tensor product of the Hilbert space of individual anyon $a$ and the Hilbert space of individual anyon $b$. In topological quantum field theory, $V^{c}_{ab}$ is the vector space associated with the pair of pants with waist labeled $c$ and legs $a$ and $b$.

More complicated Hilbert spaces can be constructed corresponding to the fusion of three or more particles, i.e. for the quantum systems where it is known that the $a_1, a_2, \ldots a_m$ fuse into final anyon type $c$. This Hilbert space $V^{c}_{a_1, a_2, \ldots a_m}$ would describe, for example, the quantum system formed by starting with a quasiparticle $c$ and, via some local physical procedure, splitting up that quasiparticle into quasiparticles $a_1, a_2, \ldots a_m$ (because in such a system all the anyons must necessarily fuse back into $c$ by topological invariance). There is an isomorphism between $V^{1}_{a_1, a_2, \ldots a_m}$ and $V^{\bar{a}_1, \bar{a}_2, \ldots \bar{a}_j }_{a_{j+1}, a_{j+2}, \ldots a_m}$ for any $j$. As mentioned in the previous section, the permutations of the labels are also isomorphic.

One can understand the structure of $V^{c}_{a_1, a_2, \ldots a_m}$ by considering fusion processes one pair of anyons at a time. There are many arbitrary ways one can do this, each of which can be used to derive a different decomposition of $V^{c}_{a_1, \ldots a_m}$ into pairs of pants. One possible choice is to first fuse $a_1$ and $a_2$ into $b_1$, then fuse $b_1$ and $a_3$ into $b_2$, and so on. This approach shows us that $V^{c}_{a_1, a_2, \ldots a_m} = \bigoplus_{\lbrace b_j \rbrace} \left( V^{b_1}_{a_1,a_2}\otimes V^{b_2}_{b_1,a_3}\otimes V^{b_3}_{b_2,a_4}\ldots V^{b_{m-2}}_{b_{m-3},a_{m-1}}\otimes V^{c}_{b_{m-2},a_{m}} \right)$, and correspondingly $N^{c}_{a_1, \ldots a_m} = \left( \prod_{j=2}^{m} N_{a_j}\right)^c_{a_1}$ where $N_a$ is the matrix defined in the previous section.

This decomposition manifestly indicates a choice of basis for the Hilbert space. Different arbitrary choices of the order in which to fuse anyons will correspond to different choices of basis.

== See also ==
- Fusion rules
