= Braid statistics =

Possible statistical behavior of particles in quantum statistical mechanics

In mathematics and theoretical physics, braid statistics is a generalization of the spin statistics of bosons and fermions based on the concept of braid group. While for fermions (bosons) the corresponding statistics is associated to a phase gain of $\pi$ ($2 \pi$) under the exchange of identical particles, a particle with braid statistics leads to a rational fraction of $\pi$ under such exchange or even a non-trivial unitary transformation in the Hilbert space (see non-Abelian anyons). A similar notion exists using a loop braid group.

== Plektons ==
Braid statistics are applicable to theoretical particles such as the two-dimensional anyons and plektons.

A plekton is a hypothetical type of particle that obeys a different style of statistics with respect to the interchange of identical particles. It obeys the causality rules of algebraic quantum field theory, where only observable quantities need to commute at spacelike separation, where anyons follow the stronger rules of traditional quantum field theory; this leads, for example, to (2+1)D anyons being massless.

== See also ==
- Braid symmetry
- Parastatistics
- Anyon
