= Spherical category =

Category in mathematics

In category theory, a branch of mathematics, a spherical category is a pivotal category (a monoidal category with traces) in which left and right traces coincide. Spherical fusion categories give rise to a family of three-dimensional topological state sum models (a particular formulation of a topological quantum field theory), the Turaev-Viro model, or rather Turaev-Viro-Barrett-Westbury model.
