= Braided monoidal category =

Object in category theory

In mathematics, a commutativity constraint $\gamma$ on a monoidal category $\mathcal{C}$ is a choice of isomorphism $\gamma_{A,B} : A\otimes B \rightarrow B\otimes A$ for each pair of objects A and B which form a natural family. In particular, to have a commutativity constraint, one must have $A \otimes B \cong B \otimes A$ for all pairs of objects $A,B \in \mathcal{C}$.

A braided monoidal category is a monoidal category $\mathcal{C}$ equipped with a braiding—that is, a commutativity constraint $\gamma$ that satisfies axioms including the hexagon identities defined below. The term braided references the fact that the braid group plays an important role in the theory of braided monoidal categories. Partly for this reason, braided monoidal categories and other topics are related in the theory of knot invariants.

Alternatively, a braided monoidal category can be seen as a tricategory with one 0-cell and one 1-cell.

Braided monoidal categories were introduced by André Joyal and Ross Street in a 1986 preprint. A modified version of this paper was published in 1993.

== The hexagon identities ==
For $\mathcal{C}$ along with the commutativity constraint $\gamma$ to be called a braided monoidal category, the following hexagonal diagrams must commute for all objects $A,B,C \in \mathcal{C}$. Here $\alpha$ is the associativity isomorphism coming from the monoidal structure on $\mathcal{C}$:

,

== Properties ==
=== Coherence ===
It can be shown that the natural isomorphism $\gamma$ along with the maps $\alpha, \lambda, \rho$ coming from the monoidal structure on the category $\mathcal{C}$, satisfy various coherence conditions, which state that various compositions of structure maps are equal. In particular:

- The braiding commutes with the units. That is, the following diagram commutes:

- The action of $\gamma$ on an $N$-fold tensor product factors through the braid group. In particular,

$(\gamma_{B,C} \otimes \text{Id}) \circ (\text{Id} \otimes \gamma_{A, C}) \circ (\gamma_{A,B} \otimes \text{Id}) = (\text{Id} \otimes \gamma_{A,B}) \circ (\gamma_{A,C} \otimes \text{Id}) \circ (\text{Id} \otimes \gamma_{B, C})$

as maps $A \otimes B \otimes C \rightarrow C \otimes B \otimes A$. Here we have left out the associator maps.

== Variations ==
There are several variants of braided monoidal categories that are used in various contexts. See, for example, the expository paper of Savage (2009) for an explanation of symmetric and coboundary monoidal categories, and the book by Chari and Pressley (1995) for ribbon categories.

=== Symmetric monoidal categories ===
A braided monoidal category is called symmetric if $\gamma$ also satisfies $\gamma_{B,A} \circ \gamma_{A,B} = \text{Id}$ for all pairs of objects $A$ and $B$. In this case the action of $\gamma$ on an $N$-fold tensor product factors through the symmetric group.

=== Ribbon categories ===
A braided monoidal category is a ribbon category if it is rigid, and it may preserve quantum trace and co-quantum trace. Ribbon categories are particularly useful in constructing knot invariants.

=== Coboundary monoidal categories ===
A coboundary or “cactus” monoidal category is a monoidal category $(C, \otimes, \text{Id})$ together with a family of natural isomorphisms $\gamma_{A,B}: A\otimes B \to B\otimes A$ with the following properties:

- $\gamma_{B,A} \circ \gamma_{A,B} = \text{Id}$ for all pairs of objects $A$ and $B$.
- $\gamma_{B \otimes A, C} \circ (\gamma_{A,B} \otimes \text{Id}) = \gamma_{A, C \otimes B} \circ (\text{Id} \otimes \gamma_{B,C})$

The first property shows us that $\gamma^{-1}_{A,B} = \gamma_{B,A}$, thus allowing us to omit the analog to the second defining diagram of a braided monoidal category and ignore the associator maps as implied.

== Examples ==
- The category of representations of a group (or a Lie algebra) is a symmetric monoidal category where $\gamma (v \otimes w) = w \otimes v$.
- The category of representations of a quantized universal enveloping algebra $U_q(\mathfrak{g})$ is a braided monoidal category, where $\gamma$ is constructed using the universal R-matrix. In fact, this example is a ribbon category as well.

== Applications ==
- Knot invariants.
- Symmetric closed monoidal categories are used in denotational models of linear logic and linear types.
- Description and classification of topological ordered quantum systems.
