= List of topology topics =

In mathematics, topology (from the Greek words τόπος, 'place, location', and λόγος, 'study') is concerned with the properties of a geometric object that are preserved under continuous deformations, such as stretching, twisting, crumpling and bending, but not tearing or gluing.

A topological space is a set endowed with a structure, called a topology, which allows defining continuous deformation of subspaces, and, more generally, all kinds of continuity. Euclidean spaces, and, more generally, metric spaces are examples of a topological space, as any distance or metric defines a topology. The deformations that are considered in topology are homeomorphisms and homotopies. A property that is invariant under such deformations is a topological property. Basic examples of topological properties are: the dimension, which allows distinguishing between a line and a surface; compactness, which allows distinguishing between a line and a circle; connectedness, which allows distinguishing a circle from two non-intersecting circles.

The ideas underlying topology go back to Gottfried Leibniz, who in the 17th century envisioned the geometria situs and analysis situs. Leonhard Euler's Seven Bridges of Königsberg problem and polyhedron formula are arguably the field's first theorems. The term topology was introduced by Johann Benedict Listing in the 19th century, although it was not until the first decades of the 20th century that the idea of a topological space was developed.

This is a list of topology topics. See also:

- Topology glossary
- List of topologies
- List of general topology topics
- List of geometric topology topics
- List of algebraic topology topics
- List of topological invariants (topological properties)
- Publications in topology

== Topology and physics ==
- Quantum topology
- Topological defect
- Topological entropy in physics
- Topological order
- Topological quantum field theory
- Topological quantum number
- Topological string theory
- Topology of the universe

== Topology and dynamical systems ==
- Milnor–Thurston kneading theory
- Topological conjugacy
- Topological dynamics
- Topological entropy
- Topological mixing

== Topology and computing ==
- Computational topology
- Digital topology
- Network topology
- Topological computing
- Topological Quantum Computing
- Topological quantum computer

== Miscellaneous ==
- Combinatorial topology
- Counterexamples in Topology
- Differential topology
- Geometric topology
- Geospatial topology
- Grothendieck topology
- Link (knot theory)
- Listing number
- Mereotopology
- Noncommutative topology
- Pointless topology
- Set-theoretic topology
- Topological combinatorics
- Topological data analysis
- Topological degree theory
- Topological game
- Topological graph theory
- Topological K-theory
- Topological modular forms
- Topological skeleton
- Topology optimization
- Water, gas, and electricity
