= Topological degeneracy =

Phenomenon in many-body quantum systems

In quantum many-body physics, topological degeneracy is a phenomenon in which the ground state of a gapped many-body Hamiltonian becomes degenerate in the limit of large system size such that the degeneracy cannot be lifted by any local perturbations.

== Applications ==
Topological degeneracy can be used to protect qubits which allows topological quantum computation. It is believed that topological degeneracy implies topological order (or long-range entanglement) in the ground state. Many-body states with topological degeneracy are described by topological quantum field theory at low energies.

== Background ==
Topological degeneracy was first introduced to physically define topological order. In two-dimensional space, the topological degeneracy depends on the topology of space, and the topological degeneracy on high genus Riemann surfaces encode all information on the quantum dimensions and the fusion algebra of the quasiparticles. In particular, the topological degeneracy on torus is equal to the number of quasiparticles types.

The topological degeneracy also appears in the situation with topological defects (such as vortices, dislocations, holes in 2D sample, ends of a 1D sample, etc.), where the topological degeneracy depends on the number of defects. Braiding those topological defect leads to topologically protected non-Abelian geometric phase, which can be used to perform topologically protected quantum computation.

Topological degeneracy of topological order can be defined on a closed space or an open space with gapped boundaries or gapped domain walls, including both Abelian topological orders and non-Abelian topological orders. The application of these types of systems for quantum computation has been proposed. In certain generalized cases, one can also design the systems with topological interfaces enriched or extended by global or gauge symmetries.

The topological degeneracy also appear in non-interacting fermion systems (such as p+ip superconductors) with trapped defects (such as vortices). In non-interacting fermion systems, there is only one type of topological degeneracy where number of the degenerate states is given by $2^{N_d/2}/2$, where $N_d$ is the number of the defects (such as the number of vortices). Such topological degeneracy is referred as "Majorana zero-mode" on the defects. In contrast, there are many types of topological degeneracy for interacting systems. A systematic description of topological degeneracy is given by tensor category (or monoidal category) theory.

== Robustness to Local Perturbations ==
A defining and crucial feature of topological degeneracy is its stability against local perturbations. This means that if a system has a topologically ordered ground state with degeneracy K, adding any small, local term to its Hamiltonian will not lift this degeneracy. The ground states remain degenerate, though their energies may shift together. This robustness is protected by the finite energy gap of the system and is the fundamental reason why topological phases are considered ideal candidates for building a fault-tolerant topological quantum computer.

The stability can be understood from the principle of local indistinguishability. The K degenerate ground states of a topologically ordered system on a manifold like a torus cannot be distinguished from one another by any local measurement. For instance, consider two such ground states, |Ψ₁⟩ and |Ψ₂⟩. If $O_x$ is any operator that acts on a finite region of space near a point x (e.g., measuring a single spin), then its expectation value will be identical for both states:

$\langle\Psi_1| O_x |\Psi_1\rangle = \langle\Psi_2| O_x |\Psi_2\rangle$

More powerfully, the off-diagonal matrix elements between these distinct ground states for any local operator are zero:

$\langle\Psi_1| O_x |\Psi_2\rangle = 0$

This mathematical property is the key to the stability. Any generic local perturbation $H_{pert}$ to the original Hamiltonian $H_0$ can be written as a sum of local operators:

$H = H_0 + \epsilon V = H_0 + \epsilon \sum_x O_x$

where ε is a small parameter controlling the strength of the perturbation. According to standard perturbation theory, a degeneracy between states |Ψ₁⟩ and |Ψ₂⟩ is lifted at first order if the matrix element ⟨Ψ₁|V|Ψ₂⟩ is non-zero. However, since V is a sum of local operators $O_x$, this matrix element is:

$\langle\Psi_1| V |\Psi_2\rangle = \sum_x \langle\Psi_1| O_x |\Psi_2\rangle = \sum_x 0 = 0$

This argument holds to all orders in perturbation theory. A product of local operators is still a local operator (acting on a slightly larger, but still finite, region), and its matrix elements between the distinct ground states will also vanish. Therefore, as long as the perturbation εV is small enough that it does not close the energy gap Δ to the excited states (which contain anyonic excitations), the ground state degeneracy remains exact.

Physically, the ground states encode global, topological information. For example, in the toric code on a torus, one ground state may correspond to a "string-net" configuration with no non-trivial loops, while another corresponds to a state with a string-net wrapping around a cycle of the torus. A local operator, which can only create or annihilate small, contractible loops in the string-net, cannot change one global configuration into another. To transition between |Ψ₁⟩ and |Ψ₂⟩, one must apply a non-local "loop operator" that acts on a path of spins stretching all the way around the torus. Since any physical source of noise or environmental error is overwhelmingly likely to be local, it cannot cause decoherence between the topologically protected ground states. This provides a passive error-correction mechanism, forming the basis of topological quantum computation.
