= Zhenghan Wang =

Chinese-American mathematician

- 王正汉
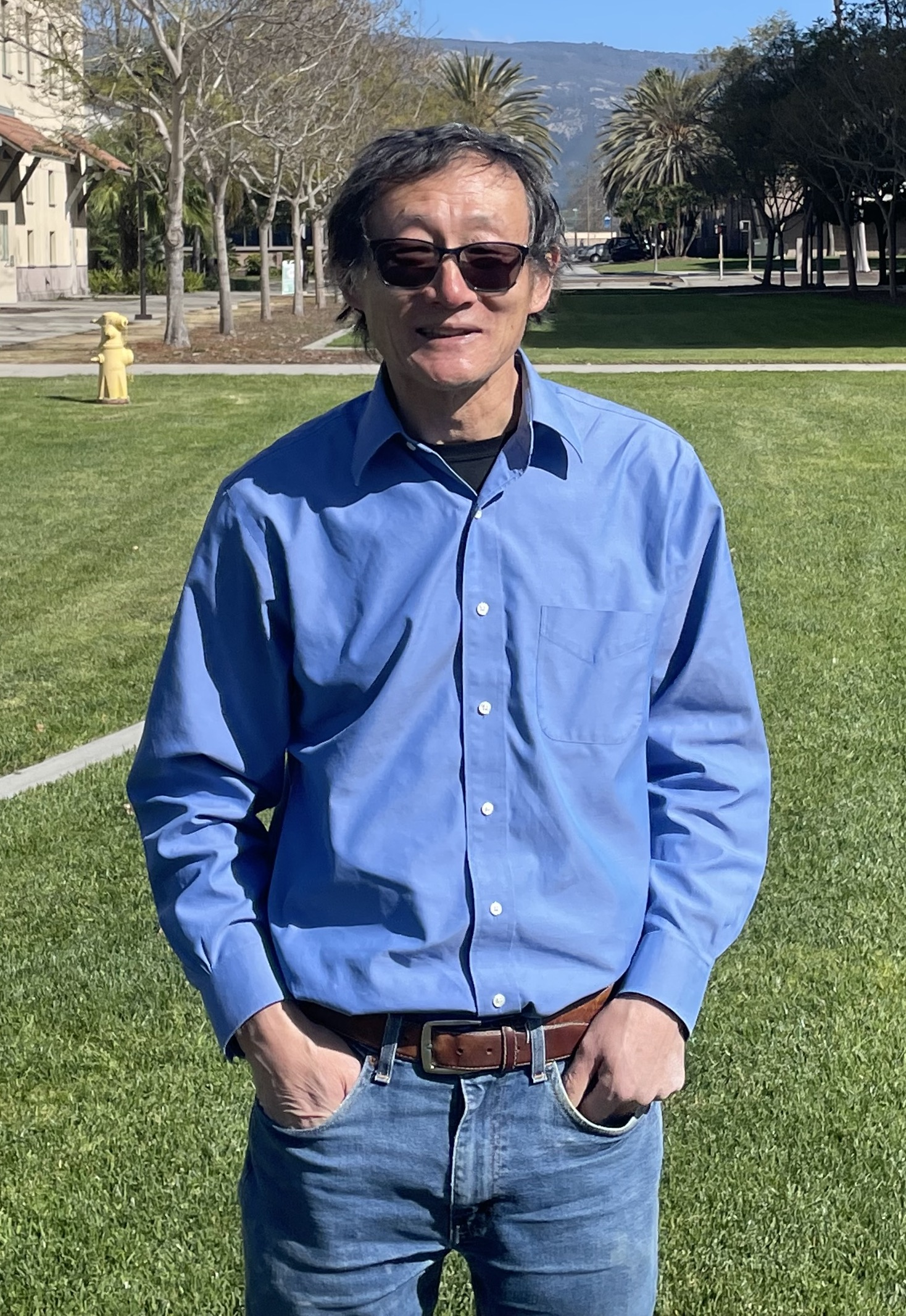
- Wang in 2024
- Born: April 26, 1965. Tsingtao, China
- Education: UC San Diego (PhD); University of Science and Technology of China (BS, MS)
- Known for: Topological quantum computing Freedman-He-Wang conjecture Walker-Wang model
- Awards: Alexanderson Award (2019)
- Scientific career
- Fields: Mathematics; Mathematical physics
- Workplaces: Microsoft Station Q UC Santa Barbara; Perimeter Institute; Indiana University Bloomington; University of Michigan
- Thesis: The Classification of Topological Four-Manifolds with Infinite Cyclic Fundamental Group (1993)
- Doctoral advisor: Michael Freedman
- Website: https://web.math.ucsb.edu/~zhenghwa/

Zhenghan Wang (Chinese: 王正汉; born April 26, 1965) is a Chinese-American mathematician. He is a principal researcher at Microsoft Station Q, as well as a professor of mathematics at the University of California, Santa Barbara.

== Education and career ==
Wang graduated with a B.S. and M.S. from the University of Science and Technology of China in 1989 and obtained his Ph.D. in 1993 from UC San Diego under the supervision of Michael Freedman. From 1993 to 1996 Wang taught as an assistant professor at the University of Michigan and from 1996 to 2007 Wang taught at Indiana University Bloomington. For the majority of this time, Wang specialized in the topology of 4-manifolds.

In 2005, Wang moved to Santa Barbara to serve as a lead scientist in the newly founded research institute Microsoft Station Q. At Station Q, Wang worked with Michael Freedman (the station's director and his former Ph.D. advisor) on the foundations of topological quantum computing. Since 2012 Wang has served as a full professor at UC Santa Barbara. From 2013 to 2020 Wang served as a distinguished visiting research chair at the Perimeter Institute for Theoretical Physics as well. Wang was included in the 2019 class of fellows of the American Mathematical Society.

== Research ==
=== Topological Quantum Computing ===
Zhenghan Wang's most notable contributions are in the field of topological quantum computation. In a series of early papers with Michael Freedman, Michael J. Larsen, and Alexei Kitaev, Wang established the abstract equivalence of topological quantum computation with the quantum circuit model. The implication of these works for topological phases is that the Fibonacci anyon model can be used to make a universal quantum computer, and the implication of these works for quantum circuits is the Aharonov–Jones–Landau algorithm. Wang has also introduced several other schemes for universal topological quantum computation using anyons which are more likely to be experimentally realizable.

=== The Algebraic Theory of Topological Phases ===
Outside of direct applications to topological quantum computing, Wang has made many contributions to the formal algebraic theory of two dimensional topological quantum phases of matter. This includes work on the structure and classification of bosonic topological order (modular tensor categories), fermionic topological order (super-modular tensor categories), and symmetry-enriched topological order (G-crossed modular tensor categories). Wang has also worked more specifically on the theory of the fractional quantum Hall effect and anyonic chains.

=== Higher Dimensional Topological Quantum Field Theory ===
In addition to his work on two dimensional topological order, Wang has also worked in the theory of three dimensional topological quantum field theory. Here he is most well known introducing the Walker-Wang model along with his coauthor Kevin Walker. This theory has been used to describe the boundaries of topological insulators and to construct nontrivial quantum cellular automata. Wang has also made contributions to the theory of three dimensional fracton phases

== Personal life ==
Wang has been married to Dr. Yanyun Chen since 1993. They have two children, a daughter and a son.
