= Xiao-Gang Wen =

Chinese-American physicist

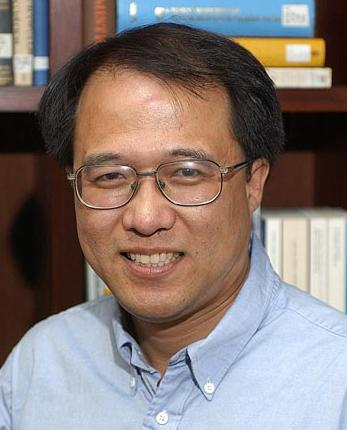
- Born: 26 November 1961 (age 64); Beijing, China
- Education: University of Science and Technology of China; Princeton University
- Scientific career
- Fields: Physics
- Workplaces: Institute for Theoretical Physics, UC Santa Barbara; Institute for Advanced Study; Perimeter Institute for Theoretical Physics; Massachusetts Institute of Technology
- Doctoral advisor: Edward Witten

Xiao-Gang Wen (simplified Chinese: 文小刚; traditional Chinese: 文小剛; pinyin: Wén Xiǎogāng; born November 26, 1961) is a Chinese-American physicist. He is a Cecil and Ida Green Professor of Physics at the Massachusetts Institute of Technology and Distinguished Visiting Research Chair at the Perimeter Institute for Theoretical Physics. His expertise is in condensed matter theory in strongly correlated electronic systems. In Oct. 2016, he was awarded the Oliver E. Buckley Condensed Matter Prize.

He is the author of a book in advanced quantum many-body theory entitled Quantum Field Theory of Many-body Systems: From the Origin of Sound to an Origin of Light and Electrons (Oxford University Press, 2004).

== Early life and education ==
Wen attended the University of Science and Technology of China and earned a B.S. in Physics in 1982.

In 1982, Wen came to the US for graduate school via the CUSPEA program, which was organized by Prof. T. D. Lee. He attended Princeton University, from which he attained an M.A. in Physics in 1983 and a Ph.D in Physics in 1987.

== Work ==
Wen studied superstring theory under theoretical physicist Edward Witten at Princeton University where he received his Ph.D. degree in 1987. He later switched his research field to condensed matter physics while working with theoretical physicists Robert Schrieffer, Frank Wilczek, Anthony Zee in Institute for Theoretical Physics, UC Santa Barbara (1987–1989).

Wen introduced the notion of topological order (1989) and quantum order (2002), to describe a new class of matter states. This opened up a new research direction in condensed matter physics. He found that states with topological order contain non-trivial boundary excitations and developed chiral Luttinger theory for the boundary states (1990). Boundary states can become ideal conduction channels which may lead to device application of topological phases. He proposed the simplest topological order — Z_{2} topological order (1990), which turns out to be the topological order in the toric code. He also proposed a special class of topological order: non-Abelian quantum Hall states. They contain emergent particles with non-Abelian statistics which generalizes the well known Bose and Fermi statistics. Non-Abelian particles may allow us to perform fault tolerant quantum computations. With Michael Levin, he found that string-net condensations can give rise to a large class of topological orders (2005). In particular, string-net condensation provides a unified origin of photons, electrons, and other elementary particles (2003). It unifies two fundamental phenomena: gauge interactions and Fermi statistics. He pointed out that topological order is nothing but the pattern of long range entanglements. This led to a notion of symmetry protected topological (SPT) order (short-range entangled states with symmetry) and its description by group cohomology of the symmetry group (2011). The notion of SPT order generalizes the notion of topological insulator to interacting cases. He also proposed the SU(2) gauge theory of high temperature superconductors (1996).

== Professional record ==
- Professor, MIT, 2000–present
- Isaac Newton Research Chair, Perimeter Institute for Theoretical Physics, 2012–2014
- Associate professor, MIT, 1995—2000
- Assistant professor, MIT, 1991—1995
- Five-year member of IAS, 1989—1991
- Member of ITP, UC Santa Barbara, 1987—1989

== Honors ==
- A.P. Sloan Foundation fellow (1992)
- Overseas Chinese Physics Association outstanding young researcher award (1994)
- Changjiang professor, Center for Advanced Study, Tsinghua University (2000—2004)
- Fellow of American Physical Society (2002)
- Cecil and Ida Green Professor of Physics, MIT (2004—present)
- Distinguished Moore Scholar, Caltech (2006)
- Distinguished Research Chair, Perimeter Institute (2009)
- Isaac Newton Chair, Perimeter Institute (announced Sep 2011)
- 2017 Oliver E. Buckley Condensed Matter Prize (announced Oct. 2016)
- Member of National Academy of Sciences (2018)
- 2018 Dirac Medal of the ICTP

== Selected publications ==
- Wen, X. G.; Wilczek, Frank; Zee, A. (1989-06-01). "Chiral spin states and superconductivity". Physical Review B. 39 (16). American Physical Society (APS): 11413–11423. Bibcode:1989PhRvB..3911413W. doi:10.1103/physrevb.39.11413. ISSN 0163-1829. PMID 9947970.
- Wen, X. G. (1990). "Topological Orders in Rigid States". International Journal of Modern Physics B. 04 (2). World Scientific Pub Co Pte Lt: 239–271. Bibcode:1990IJMPB...4..239W. doi:10.1142/s0217979290000139. ISSN 0217-9792.
- Wen, Xiao-Gang (1995). "Topological orders and edge excitations in fractional quantum Hall states". Advances in Physics. 44 (5): 405–473. arXiv:cond-mat/9506066. Bibcode:1995AdPhy..44..405W. doi:10.1080/00018739500101566. ISSN 0001-8732. S2CID 18286551.
- Wen, X. G. (1991-05-01). "Gapless boundary excitations in the quantum Hall states and in the chiral spin states". Physical Review B. 43 (13). American Physical Society (APS): 11025–11036. Bibcode:1991PhRvB..4311025W. doi:10.1103/physrevb.43.11025. ISSN 0163-1829. PMID 9996836.
- Wen, Xiao-Gang (1992-05-20). "Theory of the Edge Excitations in Fractional Quantum Hall effects". International Journal of Modern Physics B. 06 (10). World Scientific Pub Co Pte Lt: 1711–1762. doi:10.1142/s0217979292000840. ISSN 0217-9792.
- Wen, X. G. (1991-08-01). "Mean-field theory of spin-liquid states with finite energy gap and topological orders". Physical Review B. 44 (6). American Physical Society (APS): 2664–2672. Bibcode:1991PhRvB..44.2664W. doi:10.1103/physrevb.44.2664. ISSN 0163-1829. PMID 9999836.
- Blok, B.; Wen, X. G. (1990-11-01). "Effective theories of the fractional quantum Hall effect at generic filling fractions". Physical Review B. 42 (13). American Physical Society (APS): 8133–8144. Bibcode:1990PhRvB..42.8133B. doi:10.1103/physrevb.42.8133. ISSN 0163-1829. PMID 9994984.
- Blok, B.; Wen, X. G. (1990-11-01). "Effective theories of the fractional quantum Hall effect: Hierarchy construction". Physical Review B. 42 (13). American Physical Society (APS): 8145–8156. Bibcode:1990PhRvB..42.8145B. doi:10.1103/physrevb.42.8145. ISSN 0163-1829. PMID 9994985.
- Wen, X. G.; Zee, A. (1992-07-15). "Classification of Abelian quantum Hall states and matrix formulation of topological fluids". Physical Review B. 46 (4). American Physical Society (APS): 2290–2301. Bibcode:1992PhRvB..46.2290W. doi:10.1103/physrevb.46.2290. ISSN 0163-1829. PMID 10003903.
- Wen, X. G. (1991-02-11). "Non-Abelian statistics in the fractional quantum Hall states". Physical Review Letters. 66 (6). American Physical Society (APS): 802–805. Bibcode:1991PhRvL..66..802W. doi:10.1103/physrevlett.66.802. ISSN 0031-9007. PMID 10043904.
- Wen, Xiao-Gang (1993-01-18). "Topological order and edge structure of ν=1/2 quantum Hall state". Physical Review Letters. 70 (3). American Physical Society (APS): 355–358. Bibcode:1993PhRvL..70..355W. doi:10.1103/physrevlett.70.355. ISSN 0031-9007. PMID 10054091.
- Wen, Xiao-Gang; Wu, Yong-Shi (1993-03-08). "Transitions between the quantum Hall states and insulators induced by periodic potentials". Physical Review Letters. 70 (10). American Physical Society (APS): 1501–1504. Bibcode:1993PhRvL..70.1501W. doi:10.1103/physrevlett.70.1501. ISSN 0031-9007. PMID 10053308.
- Wen, Xiao-Gang (2000-04-24). "Continuous Topological Phase Transitions between Clean Quantum Hall States". Physical Review Letters. 84 (17): 3950–3953. arXiv:cond-mat/9908394. Bibcode:2000PhRvL..84.3950W. doi:10.1103/physrevlett.84.3950. ISSN 0031-9007. PMID 11019247. S2CID 26656934.
- Wen, Xiao-Gang (2002-04-10). "Quantum orders and symmetric spin liquids". Physical Review B. 65 (16) 165113. American Physical Society (APS). arXiv:cond-mat/0107071. Bibcode:2002PhRvB..65p5113W. doi:10.1103/physrevb.65.165113. ISSN 0163-1829. S2CID 10180606.
- Wen, Xiao-Gang; Lee, Patrick A. (1996-01-15). "Theory of Underdoped Cuprates". Physical Review Letters. 76 (3): 503–506. arXiv:cond-mat/9506065. Bibcode:1996PhRvL..76..503W. doi:10.1103/physrevlett.76.503. ISSN 0031-9007. PMID 10061473. S2CID 11642652.
- Lee, Patrick A.; Nagaosa, Naoto; Wen, Xiao-Gang (2006-01-06). "Doping a Mott insulator: Physics of high-temperature superconductivity". Reviews of Modern Physics. 78 (1). American Physical Society (APS): 17–85. arXiv:cond-mat/0410445. Bibcode:2006RvMP...78...17L. doi:10.1103/revmodphys.78.17. ISSN 0034-6861. S2CID 119434273.
- Levin, Michael A.; Wen, Xiao-Gang (2005-01-12). "String-net condensation: A physical mechanism for topological phases". Physical Review B. 71 (4) 045110. American Physical Society (APS). arXiv:cond-mat/0404617. Bibcode:2005PhRvB..71d5110L. doi:10.1103/physrevb.71.045110. ISSN 1098-0121. S2CID 51962817.
- Levin, Michael; Wen, Xiao-Gang (2003-06-20). "Fermions, strings, and gauge fields in lattice spin models". Physical Review B. 67 (24) 245316. American Physical Society (APS). arXiv:cond-mat/0302460. Bibcode:2003PhRvB..67x5316L. doi:10.1103/physrevb.67.245316. ISSN 0163-1829. S2CID 29180411.
- Wen, Xiao-Gang (2003-09-03). "Quantum order from string-net condensations and the origin of light and massless fermions". Physical Review D. 68 (6) 065003. American Physical Society (APS). arXiv:hep-th/0302201. Bibcode:2003PhRvD..68f5003W. doi:10.1103/physrevd.68.065003. ISSN 0556-2821. S2CID 38175587.
- Levin, Michael; Wen, Xiao-Gang (2006-03-24). "Detecting Topological Order in a Ground State Wave Function". Physical Review Letters. 96 (11) 110405. arXiv:cond-mat/0510613. Bibcode:2006PhRvL..96k0405L. doi:10.1103/physrevlett.96.110405. ISSN 0031-9007. PMID 16605803. S2CID 206329868.
- Wen, Xiao-Gang; Wang, Zhenghan (2008-06-12). "Classification of symmetric polynomials of infinite variables: Construction of Abelian and non-Abelian quantum Hall states". Physical Review B. 77 (23) 235108. arXiv:0801.3291. Bibcode:2008PhRvB..77w5108W. doi:10.1103/physrevb.77.235108. ISSN 1098-0121. S2CID 14055947.
- Wen, Xiao-Gang; Wang, Zhenghan (2008-10-09). "Topological properties of Abelian and non-Abelian quantum Hall states classified using patterns of zeros". Physical Review B. 78 (15) 155109. arXiv:0803.1016. Bibcode:2008PhRvB..78o5109W. doi:10.1103/physrevb.78.155109. ISSN 1098-0121. S2CID 19017470.
- Gu, Zheng-Cheng; Wen, Xiao-Gang (2012). "Emergence of helicity ±2 modes (gravitons) from qubit models". Nuclear Physics B. 863 (1). Elsevier BV: 90–129. arXiv:0907.1203. Bibcode:2012NuPhB.863...90G. doi:10.1016/j.nuclphysb.2012.05.010. ISSN 0550-3213. S2CID 53486475.
- Chen, Xie; Gu, Zheng-Cheng; Wen, Xiao-Gang (2010-10-26). "Local unitary transformation, long-range quantum entanglement, wave function renormalization, and topological order". Physical Review B. 82 (15) 155138. arXiv:1004.3835. Bibcode:2010PhRvB..82o5138C. doi:10.1103/physrevb.82.155138. ISSN 1098-0121. S2CID 14593420.
- Chen, Xie; Liu, Zheng-Xin; Wen, Xiao-Gang (2011-12-22). "Two-dimensional symmetry-protected topological orders and their protected gapless edge excitations". Physical Review B. 84 (23) 235141. arXiv:1106.4752. Bibcode:2011PhRvB..84w5141C. doi:10.1103/physrevb.84.235141. ISSN 1098-0121. S2CID 55330505.
- Chen, Xie; Gu, Zheng-Cheng; Liu, Zheng-Xin; Wen, Xiao-Gang (2013-04-04). "Symmetry protected topological orders and the group cohomology of their symmetry group". Physical Review B. 87 (15) 155114. arXiv:1106.4772. Bibcode:2013PhRvB..87o5114C. doi:10.1103/physrevb.87.155114. ISSN 1098-0121. S2CID 118546600.
- Wen, Xiao-Gang; Witten, Edward (1985). "Electric and magnetic charges in superstring models". Nuclear Physics B. 261. Elsevier BV: 651–677. Bibcode:1985NuPhB.261..651W. doi:10.1016/0550-3213(85)90592-9. ISSN 0550-3213.
- Wen, X. G.; Niu, Q. (1990-05-01). "Ground-state degeneracy of the fractional quantum Hall states in the presence of a random potential and on high-genus Riemann surfaces". Physical Review B. 41 (13). American Physical Society (APS): 9377–9396. Bibcode:1990PhRvB..41.9377W. doi:10.1103/physrevb.41.9377. ISSN 0163-1829. PMID 9993283.
- Wen, Xiao-Gang; Zee, A. (1992-09-21). "Neutral superfluid modes and magnetic monopoles in multilayered quantum Hall systems". Physical Review Letters. 69 (12). American Physical Society (APS): 1811–1814. Bibcode:1992PhRvL..69.1811W. doi:10.1103/physrevlett.69.1811. ISSN 0031-9007. PMID 10046320.

== See also ==
- Topological order
- String-net
- Topological entanglement entropy
