= Texture =

Texture may refer to:

== Science and technology ==
- Image texture, the spatial arrangement of color or intensities in an image
- Surface texture, the smoothness, roughness, or bumpiness of the surface of an object
- Texture (roads), road surface characteristics with waves shorter than road roughness
- Texture (cosmology), a theoretical topological defect in the structure of spacetime
- Crystallographic texture, distribution of crystallographic orientations in a polycrystalline material
- Texture (geology), a physical appearance or character of a rock
- Texture mapping, a bitmap image applied to a surface in computer graphics
- Soil texture, a relative proportion of grain sizes of a soil

== Arts ==
- Texture (visual arts), an element of design and its application in art

== Music ==
- Texture (music), an overall sound created by the interaction of aspects of a piece of music
- Textures (album), a 1989 album by Brian Eno
- Textures (band), a metal band from the Netherlands, who formed in 2001 in Tilburg

== Other uses ==
- Texture (app), a digital app giving access to magazines
- Food texture or mouthfeel
