= Topological string theory =

Theory in theoretical physics

In theoretical physics, topological string theory is a version of string theory. Topological string theory appeared in papers by theoretical physicists, such as Edward Witten and Cumrun Vafa, by analogy with Witten's earlier work on topological quantum field theory.

== Overview ==
There are two main versions of topological string theory: the topological A-model and the topological B-model. The results of the calculations in topological string theory generically encode all holomorphic quantities within the full string theory whose values are protected by spacetime supersymmetry. Various calculations in topological string theory are closely related to Chern–Simons theory, Gromov–Witten invariants, mirror symmetry, geometric Langlands Program, and many other topics.

The operators in topological string theory represent the algebra of operators in the full string theory that preserve a certain amount of supersymmetry. Topological string theory is obtained by a topological twist of the worldsheet description of ordinary string theory: the operators are given different spins. The operation is fully analogous to the construction of topological field theory which is a related concept. Consequently, there are no local degrees of freedom in topological string theory.

== Admissible spacetimes ==
The fundamental strings of string theory are two-dimensional surfaces. A quantum field theory known as the N = (1,1) sigma model is defined on each surface. This theory consist of maps from the surface to a supermanifold. Physically the supermanifold is interpreted as spacetime and each map is interpreted as the embedding of the string in spacetime.

Only special spacetimes admit topological strings. Classically, one must choose a spacetime such that the theory respects an additional pair of supersymmetries, making the spacetime an N = (2,2) sigma model. A particular case of this is if the spacetime is a Kähler manifold and the H-flux is identically equal to zero. Generalized Kähler manifolds can have a nontrivial H-flux.

=== Topological twist ===
Ordinary strings on special backgrounds are never topological. To make these strings topological, one needs to modify the sigma model via a procedure called a topological twist which was invented by Edward Witten in 1988. The central observation is that these theories have two U(1) symmetries known as R-symmetries, and the Lorentz symmetry may be modified by mixing rotations and R-symmetries. One may use either of the two R-symmetries, leading to two different theories, called the A model and the B model. After this twist, the action of the theory is BRST exact, and as a result the theory has no dynamics. Instead, all observables depend on the topology of a configuration. Such theories are known as topological theories.

Classically this procedure is always possible.

Quantum mechanically, the U(1) symmetries may be anomalous, making the twist impossible. For example, in the Kähler case with H = 0 the twist leading to the A-model is always possible but that leading to the B-model is only possible when the first Chern class of the spacetime vanishes, implying that the spacetime is Calabi–Yau. More generally (2,2) theories have two complex structures and the B model exists when the first Chern classes of associated bundles sum to zero whereas the A model exists when the difference of the Chern classes is zero. In the Kähler case the two complex structures are the same and so the difference is always zero, which is why the A model always exists.

There is no restriction on the number of dimensions of spacetime, other than that it must be even because spacetime is generalized Kähler. However, all correlation functions with worldsheets that are not spheres vanish unless the complex dimension of the spacetime is three, and so spacetimes with complex dimension three are the most interesting. This is fortunate for phenomenology, as phenomenological models often use a physical string theory compactified on a 3 complex-dimensional space. The topological string theory is not equivalent to the physical string theory, even on the same space, but certain supersymmetric quantities agree in the two theories.

== Objects ==
=== A-model ===
The topological A-model comes with a target space which is a 6 real-dimensional generalized Kähler spacetime. In the case in which the spacetime is Kähler, the theory describes two objects. There are fundamental strings, which wrap two real-dimensional holomorphic curves. Amplitudes for the scattering of these strings depend only on the Kähler form of the spacetime, and not on the complex structure. Classically these correlation functions are determined by the cohomology ring. There are quantum mechanical instanton effects which correct these and yield Gromov–Witten invariants, which measure the cup product in a deformed cohomology ring called the quantum cohomology. The string field theory of the A-model closed strings is known as Kähler gravity, and was introduced by Michael Bershadsky and Vladimir Sadov in Theory of Kähler Gravity.

In addition, there are D2-branes which wrap Lagrangian submanifolds of spacetime. These are submanifolds whose dimensions are one half that of space time, and such that the pullback of the Kähler form to the submanifold vanishes. The worldvolume theory on a stack of N D2-branes is the string field theory of the open strings of the A-model, which is a U(N) Chern–Simons theory.

The fundamental topological strings may end on the D2-branes. While the embedding of a string depends only on the Kähler form, the embeddings of the branes depends entirely on the complex structure. In particular, when a string ends on a brane the intersection will always be orthogonal, as the wedge product of the Kähler form and the holomorphic 3-form is zero. In the physical string this is necessary for the stability of the configuration, but here it is a property of Lagrangian and holomorphic cycles on a Kahler manifold.

There may also be coisotropic branes in various dimensions other than half dimensions of Lagrangian submanifolds. These were first introduced by Anton Kapustin and Dmitri Orlov in Remarks on A-Branes, Mirror Symmetry, and the Fukaya Category

=== B-model ===
The B-model also contains fundamental strings, but their scattering amplitudes depend entirely upon the complex structure and are independent of the Kähler structure. In particular, they are insensitive to worldsheet instanton effects and so can often be calculated exactly. Mirror symmetry then relates them to A model amplitudes, allowing one to compute Gromov–Witten invariants. The string field theory of the closed strings of the B-model is known as the Kodaira–Spencer theory of gravity and was developed by Michael Bershadsky, Sergio Cecotti, Hirosi Ooguri and Cumrun Vafa in Kodaira–Spencer Theory of Gravity and Exact Results for Quantum String Amplitudes.

The B-model also comes with D(-1), D1, D3 and D5-branes, which wrap holomorphic 0, 2, 4 and 6-submanifolds respectively. The 6-submanifold is a connected component of the spacetime. The theory on a D5-brane is known as holomorphic Chern–Simons theory. The Lagrangian density is the wedge product of that of ordinary Chern–Simons theory with the holomorphic (3,0)-form, which exists in the Calabi–Yau case. The Lagrangian densities of the theories on the lower-dimensional branes may be obtained from holomorphic Chern–Simons theory by dimensional reductions.

=== Topological M-theory ===
Topological M-theory, which enjoys a seven-dimensional spacetime, is not a topological string theory, as it contains no topological strings. However topological M-theory on a circle bundle over a 6-manifold has been conjectured to be equivalent to the topological A-model on that 6-manifold.

In particular, the D2-branes of the A-model lift to points at which the circle bundle degenerates, or more precisely Kaluza–Klein monopoles. The fundamental strings of the A-model lift to membranes named M2-branes in topological M-theory.

One special case that has attracted much interest is topological M-theory on a space with G_{2} holonomy and the A-model on a Calabi–Yau. In this case, the M2-branes wrap associative 3-cycles. Strictly speaking, the topological M-theory conjecture has only been made in this context, as in this case functions introduced by Nigel Hitchin in The Geometry of Three-Forms in Six and Seven Dimensions and Stable Forms and Special Metrics provide a candidate low energy effective action.

These functions are called "Hitchin functional" and Topological string is closely related to Hitchin's ideas on generalized complex structure, Hitchin system, and ADHM construction etc..

== Observables ==
=== The topological twist ===
The 2-dimensional worldsheet theory is an N = (2,2) supersymmetric sigma model, the (2,2) supersymmetry means that the fermionic generators of the supersymmetry algebra, called supercharges, may be assembled into a single Dirac spinor, which consists of two Majorana–Weyl spinors of each chirality. This sigma model is topologically twisted, which means that the Lorentz symmetry generators that appear in the supersymmetry algebra simultaneously rotate the physical spacetime and also rotate the fermionic directions via the action of one of the R-symmetries. The R-symmetry group of a 2-dimensional N = (2,2) field theory is U(1) × U(1), twists by the two different factors lead to the A and B models respectively. The topological twisted construction of topological string theories was introduced by Edward Witten in his 1988 paper.

=== What do the correlators depend on? ===
The topological twist leads to a topological theory because the stress–energy tensor may be written as an anticommutator of a supercharge and another field. As the stress–energy tensor measures the dependence of the action on the metric tensor, this implies that all correlation functions of Q-invariant operators are independent of the metric. In this sense, the theory is topological.

More generally, any D-term in the action, which is any term which may be expressed as an integral over all of superspace, is an anticommutator of a supercharge and so does not affect the topological observables. Yet more generally, in the B model any term which may be written as an integral over the fermionic $\overline\theta^\pm$ coordinates does not contribute, whereas in the A-model any term which is an integral over $\theta^-$ or over $\overline\theta^+$ does not contribute. This implies that A model observables are independent of the superpotential (as it may be written as an integral over just $\overline\theta^\pm$) but depend holomorphically on the twisted superpotential, and vice versa for the B model.

== Dualities ==
=== Dualities between TSTs ===
A number of dualities relate the above theories. The A-model and B-model on two mirror manifolds are related by mirror symmetry, which has been described as a T-duality on a three-torus. The A-model and B-model on the same manifold are conjectured to be related by S-duality, which implies the existence of several new branes, called NS branes by analogy with the NS5-brane, which wrap the same cycles as the original branes but in the opposite theory. Also a combination of the A-model and a sum of the B-model and its conjugate are related to topological M-theory by a kind of dimensional reduction. Here the degrees of freedom of the A-model and the B-models appear to not be simultaneously observable, but rather to have a relation similar to that between position and momentum in quantum mechanics.

==== The holomorphic anomaly ====
The sum of the B-model and its conjugate appears in the above duality because it is the theory whose low energy effective action is expected to be described by Hitchin's formalism. This is because the B-model suffers from a holomorphic anomaly, which states that the dependence on complex quantities, while classically holomorphic, receives nonholomorphic quantum corrections. In Quantum Background Independence in String Theory, Edward Witten argued that this structure is analogous to a structure that one finds geometrically quantizing the space of complex structures. Once this space has been quantized, only half of the dimensions simultaneously commute and so the number of degrees of freedom has been halved. This halving depends on an arbitrary choice, called a polarization. The conjugate model contains the missing degrees of freedom, and so by tensoring the B-model and its conjugate one reobtains all of the missing degrees of freedom and also eliminates the dependence on the arbitrary choice of polarization.

=== Geometric transitions ===
There are also a number of dualities that relate configurations with D-branes, which are described by open strings, to those with branes the branes replaced by flux and with the geometry described by the near-horizon geometry of the lost branes. The latter are described by closed strings.

Perhaps the first such duality is the Gopakumar–Vafa duality, which was introduced by Rajesh Gopakumar and Cumrun Vafa in On the Gauge Theory/Geometry Correspondence. This relates a stack of N D6-branes on a 3-sphere in the A-model on the deformed conifold to the closed string theory of the A-model on a resolved conifold with a B field equal to N times the string coupling constant. The open strings in the A model are described by a U(N) Chern–Simons theory, while the closed string theory on the A-model is described by the Kähler gravity.

Although the conifold is said to be resolved, the area of the blown up two-sphere is zero, it is only the B-field, which is often considered to be the complex part of the area, which is nonvanishing. In fact, as the Chern–Simons theory is topological, one may shrink the volume of the deformed three-sphere to zero and so arrive at the same geometry as in the dual theory.

The mirror dual of this duality is another duality, which relates open strings in the B model on a brane wrapping the 2-cycle in the resolved conifold to closed strings in the B model on the deformed conifold. Open strings in the B-model are described by dimensional reductions of homolomorphic Chern–Simons theory on the branes on which they end, while closed strings in the B model are described by Kodaira–Spencer gravity.

=== Dualities with other theories ===
==== Crystal melting, quantum foam and U(1) gauge theory ====
In the paper Quantum Calabi–Yau and Classical Crystals, Andrei Okounkov, Nicolai Reshetikhin and Cumrun Vafa conjectured that the quantum A-model is dual to a classical melting crystal at a temperature equal to the inverse of the string coupling constant. This conjecture was interpreted in Quantum Foam and Topological Strings, by Amer Iqbal, Nikita Nekrasov, Andrei Okounkov and Cumrun Vafa. They claim that the statistical sum over melting crystal configurations is equivalent to a path integral over changes in spacetime topology supported in small regions with area of order the product of the string coupling constant and α'.

Such configurations, with spacetime full of many small bubbles, dates back to John Archibald Wheeler in 1964, but has rarely appeared in string theory as it is notoriously difficult to make precise. However in this duality the authors are able to cast the dynamics of the quantum foam in the familiar language of a topologically twisted U(1) gauge theory, whose field strength is linearly related to the Kähler form of the A-model. In particular this suggests that the A-model Kähler form should be quantized.

== Applications ==
A-model topological string theory amplitudes are used to compute prepotentials in N=2 supersymmetric gauge theories in four and five dimensions. The amplitudes of the topological B-model, with fluxes and or branes, are used to compute superpotentials in N=1 supersymmetric gauge theories in four dimensions. Perturbative A model calculations also count BPS states of spinning black holes in five dimensions.

== See also ==
- Quantum topology
- Topological defect
- Topological entropy in physics
- Topological order
- Topological quantum field theory
- Topological quantum number
- Introduction to M-theory
