= Fracton (subdimensional particle) =

Theoretical subdimensional particle

A fracton is an emergent topological quasiparticle excitation which is immobile when in isolation. Many theoretical systems have been proposed in which fractons exist as elementary excitations. Such systems are known as fracton models. Fractons have been identified in various CSS codes as well as in symmetric tensor gauge theories.

Gapped fracton models often feature a topological ground state degeneracy that grows exponentially and sub-extensively with system size. Among the gapped phases of fracton models, there is a non-rigorous phenomenological classification into "type I" and "type II". Type I fracton models generally have fracton excitations that are completely immobile, as well as other excitations, including bound states, with restricted mobility. Type II fracton models generally have fracton excitations and no mobile particles of any form. Furthermore, isolated fracton particles in type II models are associated with nonlocal operators with intricate fractal structure.

== Models ==
=== Type I ===
The paradigmatic example of a type I fracton model is the X-cube model. Other examples of type I fracton models include the semionic X-cube model, the checkerboard model, the Majorana checkerboard model, the stacked Kagome X-cube model, the hyperkagome X-cube model, and more.

==== X-cube model ====
The X-cube model is constructed on a cubic lattice, with qubits on each edge of the lattice.

The Hamiltonian is given by

$$H = -\sum_{c} A_c - \sum_{\textrm{}v} (B_{v,x} + B_{v,y} + B_{v,z})$$

Here, the sums run over cubic unit cells and over vertices. For any cubic unit cell $c$, the operator $A_c$ is equal to the product of the Pauli $X$ operator on all 12 edges of that unit cube. For any vertex of the lattice $v$, operator $B_{v,\mu}$ is equal to the product of the Pauli $Z$ operator on all four edges adjacent to vertex $v$ and perpendicular to the $\mu$ axis. Other notation conventions in the literature may interchange $X$ and $Z$.

In addition to obeying an overall $Z_2 \times Z_2$ symmetry defined by global symmetry generators $\prod_\ell X_\ell$ and $\prod_\ell Z_\ell$ where the product runs over all edges in the lattice, this Hamiltonian obeys subsystem symmetries acting on individual planes.

All of the terms in this Hamiltonian commute and belong to the Pauli algebra. This makes the Hamiltonian exactly solvable. One can simultaneously diagonalise all the terms in the Hamiltonian, and the simultaneous eigenstates are the Hamiltonian's energy eigenstates. A ground state of this Hamiltonian is a state $|\mathrm{GS}\rangle$ that satisfies $A_c |\mathrm{GS}\rangle = 1$ and $B_{v, \mu} |\mathrm{GS}\rangle =1$ for all $c, v , \mu$. One can explicitly write down a ground state using projection operators $\frac{1+A_c}{2}$ and $\frac{1+B_{v,\mu}}{2}$.

The constraints posed by $A_c =1$ and $B_{v,\mu} =1$ are not all linearly independent when the X cube model is embedded on a compact manifold. This leads to a large ground state degeneracy that increases with system size. On a torus with dimensions $L_x, L_y, L_z$, the ground state degeneracy is exactly $2^{2L_x+2L_y + 2L_z-3}$ . A similar degeneracy scaling, $\log \mathrm{GSD} \propto L$, is seen on other manifolds as well as in the thermodynamic limit.

===== Restricted mobility excitations =====
The X cube model hosts two types of elementary excitations, the fracton and lineon (also known as the one-dimensional particle).

If a quantum state is such that the eigenvalue of $A_c = -1$ for some unit cube $c$, then we say that, in this quantum state, there is a fracton located at the position $c$. For example, if $|\mathrm{GS}\rangle$ is a ground state of the Hamiltonian, then for any edge $\ell$, the state $X_\ell |\mathrm{GS}\rangle$ features four fractons, one each on the cubes adjacent to $\ell$.

Given a rectangle $R$ in a plane, one can define a "membrane" operator as $Z_R \equiv \prod_{\ell \in R} Z_{\ell}$ where the product runs over all edges $\ell$ perpendicular to the rectangle that pass through this rectangle. Then the state $Z_R|\mathrm{GS}\rangle$ features four fractons each located at the cubes next to the corners of the rectangle. Thus, an isolated fracton can appear in the limit of taking the length and width of the rectangle $R$ to infinity. The fact that a nonlocal membrane operator acts on the ground state to produce an isolated fracton is analogous to how, in smaller dimensional systems, nonlocal string operators can produce isolated $\pi$ flux particles and domain walls.

This construction shows that an isolated fracton cannot be mobile in any direction. In other words, there is no local operator that can be acted on an isolated fracton to move it to a different location. In order to move an individual isolated fracton, one would need to apply a highly nonlocal operator to move the entire membrane associated with it.

If a quantum state is such that the eigenvalue of $B_{v,x} = B_{v,y} = -1$ for some vertex $v$, then we say that, in this quantum state, there is a lineon located at the position $v$ that is mobile in the $z$ direction. A similar definition holds for lineons that are mobile in the $x$ direction and lineons that are mobile in the $y$ direction. In order to create an isolated $z$ lineon at a vertex $v$, one must act on the ground state with a long string of Pauli $X$ operators acting on all the edges along the $z$ axis that are below the lineon. Lineon excitations are mobile in one direction only; the Pauli $X$ operator can act on lineons to translate them along that direction.

An $x, y$ and $z$ lineon can all fuse into the vacuum, if the lines on which each of them move concur. That is, there is a sequence of local operators that can make this fusion happen. The opposite process can also happen. For a similar reason, an isolated lineon can change direction of motion from $x$ to $y$, creating a new lineon moving in the $z$ direction in the process. The new lineon is created at the point in space where the original lineon changes direction.

It is also possible to make bound states of these elementary excitations that have higher mobility. For example, consider the bound state of two fractons with the same $x$ and $y$ coordinates separated by a finite distance $w$ along the $z$ axis. This bound state, called a planeon, is mobile in all directions in the $xy$ plane. One can construct a membrane operator with width $w$ in the $z$ axis and arbitrary length in either the $x$ or $y$ direction that can act on the planeon state to move it within the $xy$ plane.

===== Interferometry =====
It is possible to remotely detect the presence of an isolated elementary excitation in a region by moving the opposite type of elementary excitation around it. Here, as usual, "moving" refers to the repeated action of local unitary operators that translate the particles. This process is known as interferometry. It can be considered analogous to the idea of braiding anyons in two dimensions.

For example, suppose a lineon (either an $x$ lineon or a $y$ lineon) is located in the $xy$ plane, and there is also a planeon that can move in the $xy$ plane. Then we can move the planeon in a full rotation that happens to encompass the position of the lineon. Such a planeon movement would be implemented by a membrane operator. If this membrane operator intersects with the Pauli-$X$ string operator attached to the lineon exactly one time, then at the end of the rotation of the planeon the wave function will pick up a factor of $-1$, which indicates the presence of the lineon.

===== Coupled layer construction =====
It is possible to construct the X cube model by taking three stacks of toric code sheets, on along each of the three axes, superimposing them, and adding couplings to the edges where they intersect. This construction explains some of the connections that can be seen between the toric code topological order and the X cube model. For example, each additional toric code sheet can be understood to contribute a topological degeneracy of 4 to the overall ground state degeneracy of the X cube model when it is placed on a three dimensional torus; this is consistent with the formula for the ground state degeneracy of the X cube model.

==== Checkerboard Model ====
Another example of a type I fracton model is the checkerboard model.

This model also lives on a cubic lattice, but with one qubit on each vertex. First, one colours the cubic unit cells with the colours $A$ and $B$ in a checkerboard pattern, i.e. such that no two adjacent cubic cells are the same colour. Then the Hamiltonian is

$$H = - \sum_{c\in A} \prod_{v \in c} X_v - \sum_{c\in A} \prod_{v \in c} Z_v$$

This model is also exactly solvable with commuting terms. The topological ground state degeneracy on a torus is given by $\log_2 \mathrm{GSD} = 4 L_x + 4L_y + 4L_z-6$ for lattice of size $2L_x, 2L_y, 2L_z$ (as a rule the dimensions of the lattice must be even for periodic boundary conditions to make sense).

Like the X cube model, the checkerboard model features excitations in the form of fractons, lineons, and planeons.

=== Type II ===
The paradigmatic example of a type II fracton model is Haah's code. Due to the more complicated nature of Haah's code, the generalisations to other type II models are poorly understood compared to type I models.

==== Haah's code ====
Haah's code is defined on a cubic lattice with two qubits on each vertex. We can refer to these qubits using Pauli matrices $\vec{\sigma}_v$ and $\vec{\mu}_v$, each acting on a separate qubit. The Hamiltonian is

$$H = -\sum_c ( A_c + B_c)$$.

Here, for any unit cube $c$ whose eight vertices are labeled as $p$, $q_1 = p+(1,0,0)$, $q_2 = p+(0,1,0)$, $q_3 = p+(0,0,1)$, $r_1 = p+(0,1,1)$, $r_2 = p+(1,0,1)$, $r_3 = p+(1,1,0)$ , and $s = p+(1,1,1)$, the operators $A_c$ and $B_c$ are defined as

$$A_c = \sigma_s^z \mu_s^z \prod_{j=1}^3 \mu_{q_j}^z \sigma_{r_j}^z$$
$$B_c = \sigma_p^x \mu_p^x \prod_{j=1}^3 \mu_{q_j}^x \sigma_{r_j}^x$$

This is also an exactly solvable model, as all terms of the Hamiltonian commute with each other.

The ground state degeneracy for an $L \times L \times L$ torus is given by

$\log_2 \mathrm{GSD} = 4 \deg( \gcd ( 1 + (1+x)^L, 1+(1+\omega x)^L, 1+ (1+\omega^2 x)^L)_{\mathbb{F}_4})-2 .$

Here, gcd denotes the greatest common divisor of the three polynomials shown, and deg refers to the degree of this common divisor. The coefficients of the polynomials belong to the finite field $\mathbb{F}_4$, consisting of the four elements $\lbrace 0,1, \omega, \omega^2 \rbrace$ of characteristic 2 (i.e. $1+1= 0$). $\omega$ is a cube root of 1 that is distinct from 1. The greatest common divisor can be defined through Euclid's algorithm. This degeneracy fluctuates wildly as a function of $L$. If $L$ is a power of 2, then according to Lucas's theorem the three polynomials take the simple forms $x^L, (\omega x)^L, (\omega^2 x)^L$, indicating a ground state degeneracy of $2^{4L-2}$. More generally, if $2^m$ is the largest power of 2 that divides $L$, then the ground state degeneracy is at least $2^{2^{m+2}-2}$ and at most $2^{4L-2}$.

Thus the Haah's code fracton model also in some sense exhibits the property that the logarithm of the ground state degeneracy tends to scale in direct proportion to the linear dimension of the system. This appears to be a general property of gapped fracton models. Just like in type I models and in topologically ordered systems, different ground states of Haah's code cannot be distinguished by local operators.

Haah's code also features immobile elementary excitations called fractons. A quantum state is said to have a fracton located at a cube $c$ if the eigenvalue of $A_c$ is $-1$ for this quantum state (an excitation of the $B_c$ operator is also a fracton. Such a fracton is physically equivalent to an excitation of $A_c$ because there is a unitary map exchanging $A_c$ and $B_c$, so it suffices to consider excitations of $A_c$ only for this discussion).

If $|\mathrm{GS}\rangle$ is a ground state of the Hamiltonian, then for any vertex $v$, the state $\mu^x_v |\mathrm{GS}\rangle$ features four fractons in a tetrahedral arrangement, occupying four of the eight cubes adjacent to vertex $v$ (the same is true for the state $\sigma^x_v |\mathrm{GS}\rangle$, although the exact shape of the tetrahedron is different).

In an attempt to isolate just one of these four fractons, one may try to apply additional $\mu^x_{v'} |\mathrm{GS}\rangle$ spin flips at different nearby vertices to try annihilate the three other fractons. Doing so simply results in three new fractons appearing further away. Motivated by this process, one can then identify a set $S$ of vertices in space that together form some arbitrary iteration of the three-dimensional Sierpiński fractal. Then the state

$$\psi =  \prod_{v \in S} \mu^z_v |\mathrm{GS}\rangle$$

features four fractons, one each at a cube adjacent to a corner vertex of the Sierpinski tetrahedron. Thus we see that an infinitely large fractal-shaped operator is required to generate an isolated fracton out of the ground state in the Haah's code model. The fractal-shaped operator in Haah's code plays an analogous role to the membrane operators in the X-cube model.

Unlike in type I models, there are no stable bound states of a finite number of fractons that are mobile. The only mobile bound states are those such as the completely mobile four-fracton states like $\mu^x_v |\mathrm{GS}\rangle$ that are unstable (i.e. can transform into the ground state by the action of a local operator).

== Foliated fracton order ==
One formalism used to understand the universal properties of type I fracton phases is called foliated fracton order. A generalized version is proposed to incorporate non-Abelian fracton orders.

Foliated fracton order establishes an equivalence relation between two systems, system $A$ and system $B$, with Hamiltonians $H_A$ and $H_B$. If one can transform the ground state of $H_A$ to the ground state of $H_B$ by applying a finite depth local unitary map and arbitrarily adding and/or removing two-dimensional gapped systems, then $H_1$ and $H_2$ are said to belong to the same foliated fracton order.

It is important in this definition that the local unitary map remains at finite depth as the sizes of systems 1 and 2 are taken to the thermodynamic limit. However, the number of gapped systems being added or removed can be infinite. The fact that two-dimensional topologically ordered gapped systems can be freely added or removed in the transformation process is what distinguishes foliated fracton order form more conventional notions of phases. To state the definition more precisely, suppose one can find two (possibly empty or infinite) collections of two-dimensional gapped phases (with arbitrary topological order), $H^{2\mathrm{D}, A}_j$ and $H^{2\mathrm{D},B}_j$, and a finite depth local unitary map $U$, such that $U$ maps the ground state of $H_A \otimes \bigotimes_j H^{2\mathrm{D},A}_j$ to the ground state of $H_B \otimes \bigotimes_j H^{2\mathrm{D},B}_j$. Then $H_A$ and $H_B$ belong to the same foliated fracton order.

More conventional notions of phase equivalence fail to give sensible results when directly applied to fracton models, because they are based on the notion that two models in the same phase should have the same topological ground state degeneracy. Since the ground state degeneracy of fracton models scales with system size, these conventional definitions would imply that simply changing the system size slightly would alter the entire phase. This would make it impossible to study the phases of fracton matter in the thermodynamic limit where system size $L \to \infty$. The concept of foliated fracton order resolves this issue, by allowing degenerate subsystems (two-dimensional gapped topological phases) to be used as "free resources" that can be arbitrarily added or removed from the system to account for these differences. If a fracton model $H$ is such that $H(L_x, L_y, L_z)$ is in the same foliated fracton order as $H(L'_x, L'_y, L'_z)$ for a larger system size, then the foliated fracton order formalism is suitable for the model.

Foliated fracton order is not a suitable formalism for type II fracton models.

=== Known foliated fracton orders of type I models ===
Many of the known type I fracton model are in fact in the same foliated fracton order as the X cube Model, or in the same foliated fracton order as multiple copies of the X cube model. However, not all are. A notable known example of a distinct foliated fracton order is the twisted foliated fracton model.

Explicit local unitary maps have been constructed that demonstrate the equivalence of the X cube model with various other models, such as the Majorana checkerboard model and the semionic X cube model. The checkerboard model belongs to the same foliated fracton order as two copies of the X cube model.

=== Invariants of foliated fracton order ===
Just like how topological orders tend to have various invariant quantities that represent topological signatures, one can also attempt to identify invariants of foliated fracton orders.

Conventional topological orders often exhibit ground state degeneracy which is dependent only on the topology of the manifold on which the system is embedded. Fracton models do not have this property, because the ground state degeneracy also depends on system size. Furthermore, in foliated fracton models the ground state degeneracy can also depend on the intricacies of the foliation structure used to construct it. In other words, the same type of model on the same manifold with the same system size may have different ground state degeneracies depending on the underlying choice of foliation.

==== Quotient superselection sectors ====
By definition, the number of superselection sectors in a fracton model is infinite (i.e. scales with system size). For example, each individual fracton belongs to its own superselection sector, as there is no local operator that can transform it to any other fracton at a different position.

However, a loosening of the concept of superselection sector, known as the quotient superselection sector, effectively ignores two-dimensional particles (e.g. planeon bound states) which are presumed to come from two-dimensional foliating layers. Foliated fracton models then tend to have a finite list of quotient superselection sectors describing the types of fractional excitations present in the model. This is analogous to how topological orders tend to have a finite list of ordinary superselection sectors.

==== Entanglement Entropy ====
Generally for fracton models in the ground state, when considering the entanglement entropy of a subregion of space with large linear size $R$, the leading order contribution to the entropy is proportional to $R^2$, as expected for a gapped three dimensional system obeying an area law. However, the entanglement entropy also has subleading terms as a function of $R$ that reflect hidden nonlocal contributions. For example, the $\propto R$ subleading correction represents a contribution from the constant topological entanglement entropy of each of the 2D topologically ordered layers present in the foliation structure of the system.

Since foliated fracton order is invariant even when disentangling such 2D gapped layers, an entanglement signature of a foliated fracton order must be able to ignore of the entropy contributions both from local details and from 2D topologically ordered layers.

It is possible to use a mutual information calculation to extract a contribution to entanglement entropy that is unique to the foliated fracton order. Effectively, this is done by adding and subtracting entanglement entropies of different regions in such a way as to get rid of local contributions as well as contributions from 2D gapped layers.

== Symmetric tensor gauge theory ==
The immobility of fractons in symmetric tensor gauge theory can be understood as a generalization of electric charge conservation resulting from a modified Gauss's law. Various formulations and constraints of symmetric tensor gauge theory tend to result in conservation laws that imply the existence of restricted-mobility particles.

=== U(1) scalar charge model ===
For example, in the U(1) scalar charge model, the fracton charge density ($\rho$) is related to a symmetric electric field tensor ($E_{ij}$, a theoretical generalization of the usual electric vector field) via $\rho = \partial_i \partial_j E_{ij}$, where the repeated spatial indices $i,j=1,2,3$ are implicitly summed over. Both the fracton charge ($q$) and dipole moment ($p_i$) can be shown to be conserved:

$$\begin{align}
q &= \int \rho \; d^3x = \int \partial_i (\partial_j E_{ij}) \; d^3x = 0 \\
p_i &= \int x_i \rho \; d^3x = \int x_i \partial_j \partial_k E_{jk} \; d^3x = - \int \partial_k E_{ik} \; d^3x = 0
\end{align}$$

When integrating by parts, we have assumed that there is no electric field at spatial infinity. Since the total fracton charge and dipole moment is zero under this assumption, this implies that the charge and dipole moment is conserved. Because moving an isolated charge changes the total dipole moment, this implies that isolated charges are immobile in this theory. However, two oppositely charged fractons, which forms a fracton dipole, can move freely since this does not change the dipole moment.

One approach to constructing an explicit action for scalar fractonic matter fields and their coupling to the symmetric tensor gauge theory is the following. Suppose the scalar fractonic matter field is $\Phi$. A global charge conservation symmetry would imply that the action is symmetric under the transformation $\Phi \to e^{i\alpha} \Phi$ for some spatially uniform real $\alpha$, as is the case in usual $U(1)$ charged theories. A global dipole moment conservation symmetry would imply that the action is symmetric under the transformation $\Phi(\vec r) \to e^{i \vec \lambda \cdot \vec r} \Phi(\vec{r})$ for an arbitrary real spatially uniform vector $\vec \lambda$. The simplest kinetic terms (i.e. terms featuring the spatial derivative) that are symmetric under these transformations are quartic in $\Phi$.

$$\mathcal{L} = |\partial_t \Phi|^2 -m^2|\Phi|^2 - g|\Phi \partial_i \partial_j \Phi - \partial_i \Phi \partial_j \Phi|^2 -g' \Phi^{*2}(\Phi \partial_i \partial_j \Phi - \partial_i \Phi \partial_j \Phi) +\ldots$$

Now when gauging this symmetry, the kinetic expression $\Phi \partial_i \partial_j \Phi - \partial_i \Phi \partial_j \Phi$ gets replaced with $\Phi \partial_i \partial_j \Phi - \partial_i \Phi \partial_j \Phi -i A_{ij} \Phi^2$, where $A_{ij}$ is a symmetric tensor that transforms under arbitrary gauge transformations as $A_{ij} \to A_{ij}+\partial_i \partial_j \alpha$. This shows how a symmetric tensor field couples to scalar fractonic matter fields.

=== U(1) vector charge model ===
The U(1) scalar charge theory is not the only symmetric tensor gauge theory that is gives rise to limited mobility particles. Another example is the U(1) vector charge theory.

In this theory, the fractonic charge is a vector quantity $\vec{\rho}$. The symmetric tensor gauge field transforms under gauge transformations $\vec{\alpha}$ as $A_{ij} \to A_{ij} + \partial_i \alpha_j + \partial_j \alpha _i$. The Gauss law for this theory takes the form $\partial_i E_{ij} = \rho_j$, which implies both a total charge conservation and a conservation of total angular charge moment $\int d^3 x \vec{\rho} \otimes \vec{x}$. The latter conservation law implies that isolated charges are restricted to move parallel to their corresponding charge vectors. Thus these particles appear to be similar to the lineons in Type I fractons, except here they are in a gapless theory.

== Applications ==
Fractons were originally studied as an analytically tractable realization of quantum glassiness where the immobility of isolated fractons results in a slow relaxation rate. This immobility has also been shown to be capable of producing a partially self-correcting quantum memory, which could be useful for making an analog of a hard drive for a quantum computer. Fractons have also been shown to appear in quantum linearized gravity models and (via a duality) as disclination crystal defects. However, aside from the duality to crystal defects, and although it has been shown to be possible in principle, other experimental realizations of gapped fracton models have not yet been realized. On the other hand, there has been progress in studying the dynamics of dipole-conserving systems, both theoretically and experimentally, which exhibit the characteristic slow dynamics expected of systems with fractonic behavior.

== Fracton models ==
	U(1) symmetric tensor gauge theory	type-I	type-II
energy spectrum	gapless	gapped	gapped
example models	scalar charge	X-cube	Haah's cubic code
example characteristics	conserved dipole moment	conserved charge on stacks of two-dimensional surfaces	fractal conservation laws, no mobile particles

It has been conjectured that many type-I models are examples of foliated fracton phases. However, non-Abelian fracton models are generally not foliated. This has been explicitly shown for the Ising cage-net model. A generalized foliation framework has been proposed to understand these non-Abelian fracton phases.
