= Quantum dimer models =

Model of the physics of resonating valence bond states in lattice spin systems

Quantum dimer models were introduced to model the physics of resonating valence bond (RVB) states in lattice spin systems. The only degrees of freedom retained from the motivating spin systems are the valence bonds, represented as dimers which live on the lattice bonds. In typical dimer models, the dimers do not overlap ("hardcore constraint").

Typical phases of quantum dimer models tend to be valence bond crystals. However, on non-bipartite lattices, RVB liquid phases possessing topological order and fractionalized spinons also appear. The discovery of topological order in quantum dimer models (more than a decade after the models were introduced) has led to new interest in these models.

Classical dimer models have been studied previously in statistical physics, in particular by P. W. Kasteleyn (1961) and M. E. Fisher (1961).
