= Hitchin functional =

Concept in mathematical physics

The Hitchin functional is a mathematical concept with applications in string theory that was introduced by the British mathematician Nigel Hitchin. Hitchin (2000) and Hitchin (2001) are the original articles of the Hitchin functional.

As with Hitchin's introduction of generalized complex manifolds, this is an example of a mathematical tool found useful in mathematical physics.

== Formal definition ==
This is the definition for 6-manifolds. The definition in Hitchin's article is more general, but more abstract.

Let $M$ be a compact, oriented 6-manifold with trivial canonical bundle. Then the Hitchin functional is a functional on 3-forms defined by the formula:

$$\Phi(\Omega) = \int_M \Omega \wedge * \Omega,$$

where $\Omega$ is a 3-form and * denotes the Hodge star operator.

== Properties ==
- The Hitchin functional is analogous for six-manifold to the Yang-Mills functional for the four-manifolds.
- The Hitchin functional is manifestly invariant under the action of the group of orientation-preserving diffeomorphisms.
- Theorem. Suppose that $M$ is a three-dimensional complex manifold and $\Omega$ is the real part of a non-vanishing holomorphic 3-form, then $\Omega$ is a critical point of the functional $\Phi$ restricted to the cohomology class $[\Omega] \in H^3(M,R)$. Conversely, if $\Omega$ is a critical point of the functional $\Phi$ in a given comohology class and $\Omega \wedge * \Omega < 0$, then $\Omega$ defines the structure of a complex manifold, such that $\Omega$ is the real part of a non-vanishing holomorphic 3-form on $M$.

The proof of the theorem in Hitchin's articles Hitchin (2000) and Hitchin (2001) is relatively straightforward. The power of this concept is in the converse statement: if the exact form $\Phi(\Omega)$ is known, we only have to look at its critical points to find the possible complex structures.

== Stable forms ==
Action functionals often determine geometric structure on $M$ and geometric structure are often characterized by the existence of particular differential forms on $M$ that obey some integrable conditions.

If an 2-form $\omega$ can be written with local coordinates

$$\omega=dp_1\wedge dq_1+\cdots+dp_m\wedge dq_m$$

and

$$d\omega=0$$,

then $\omega$ defines symplectic structure.

A p-form $\omega\in\Omega^p(M,\mathbb{R})$ is stable if it lies in an open orbit of the local $GL(n,\mathbb{R})$ action where n=dim(M), namely if any small perturbation $\omega\mapsto\omega+\delta\omega$ can be undone by a local $GL(n,\mathbb{R})$ action. So any 1-form that don't vanish everywhere is stable; 2-form (or p-form when p is even) stability is equivalent to non-degeneracy.

What about p=3? For large n 3-form is difficult because the dimension of $\wedge^3(\mathbb{R}^n)$, is of the order of $n^3$, grows more fastly than the dimension of $GL(n,\mathbb{R})$ which is $n^2$. But there are some very lucky exceptional case, namely, $n=6$, when dim $\wedge^3(\mathbb{R}^6)=20$, dim $GL(6,\mathbb{R})=36$. Let $\rho$ be a stable real 3-form in dimension 6. Then the stabilizer of $\rho$ under $GL(6,\mathbb{R})$ has real dimension 36-20=16, in fact either $SL(3,\mathbb{R})\times SL(3,\mathbb{R})$ or $SL(3,\mathbb{C})$.

Focus on the case of $SL(3,\mathbb{C})$ and if $\rho$ has a stabilizer in $SL(3,\mathbb{C})$ then it can be written with local coordinates as follows:

$$\rho=\frac{1}{2}(\zeta_1\wedge\zeta_2\wedge\zeta_3+\bar{\zeta_1}\wedge\bar{\zeta_2}\wedge\bar{\zeta_3})$$

where $\zeta_1=e_1+ie_2,\zeta_2=e_3+ie_4,\zeta_3=e_5+ie_6$ and $e_i$ are bases of $T^*M$. Then $\zeta_i$ determines an almost complex structure on $M$. Moreover, if there exist local coordinate $(z_1,z_2,z_3)$ such that $\zeta_i=dz_i$ then it determines fortunately a complex structure on $M$.

Given the stable $\rho\in\Omega^3(M,\mathbb{R})$:

$$\rho=\frac{1}{2}(\zeta_1\wedge\zeta_2\wedge\zeta_3+\bar{\zeta_1}\wedge\bar{\zeta_2}\wedge\bar{\zeta_3})$$.

We can define another real 3-from

$$\tilde{\rho}(\rho)=\frac{1}{2}(\zeta_1\wedge\zeta_2\wedge\zeta_3-\bar{\zeta_1}\wedge\bar{\zeta_2}\wedge\bar{\zeta_3})$$.

And then $\Omega=\rho+i\tilde{\rho}(\rho)$ is a holomorphic 3-form in the almost complex structure determined by $\rho$. Furthermore, it becomes to be the complex structure just if $d\Omega=0$ i.e. $d\rho=0$ and $d\tilde{\rho}(\rho)=0$. This $\Omega$ is just the 3-form $\Omega$ in formal definition of Hitchin functional. These idea induces the generalized complex structure.

== Use in string theory ==
Hitchin functionals arise in many areas of string theory. An example is the compactifications of the 10-dimensional string with a subsequent orientifold projection $\kappa$ using an involution $\nu$. In this case, $M$ is the internal 6 (real) dimensional Calabi-Yau space. The couplings to the complexified Kähler coordinates $\tau$ is given by

$$g_{ij} = \tau \text{im} \int \tau i^*(\nu \cdot \kappa \tau).$$

The potential function is the functional $V[J] = \int J \wedge J \wedge J$, where J is the almost complex structure. Both are Hitchin functionals.Grimm & Louis (2005)

As application to string theory, the famous OSV conjecture Ooguri, Strominger & Vafa (2004) used Hitchin functional in order to relate topological string to 4-dimensional black hole entropy. Using similar technique in the $G_2$ holonomy Dijkgraaf et al. (2005) argued about topological M-theory and in the $Spin(7)$ holonomy topological F-theory might be argued.

More recently, E. Witten claimed the mysterious superconformal field theory in six dimensions, called 6D (2,0) superconformal field theory Witten (2007). Hitchin functional gives one of the bases of it.
