= Topological entropy in physics =

Type of physical entropy

The topological entanglement entropy (TEE), usually denoted by $\gamma$, is a number characterizing many-body states that possess topological order.

A non-zero topological entanglement entropy reflects the presence of long range quantum entanglements in a many-body quantum state. So the topological entanglement entropy links topological order with pattern of long range quantum entanglements.

Given a topologically ordered state, the topological entropy can be extracted from the asymptotic behavior of the Von Neumann entropy measuring the quantum entanglement between a spatial block and the rest of the system. The entanglement entropy of a simply connected region of boundary length L, within an infinite two-dimensional topologically ordered state, has the following form for large L:

$$S_L \; \longrightarrow \; \alpha L -\gamma +\mathcal{O}(L^{-\nu}) \; , \qquad  \nu>0 \,\!$$

where $-\gamma$ is the topological entanglement entropy.

The topological entanglement entropy is equal to the logarithm of the total quantum dimension of the quasiparticle excitations of the state.

For example, the simplest fractional quantum Hall states, the Laughlin states at filling fraction 1/m, have γ = ½log(m). The Z_{2} fractionalized states, such as topologically ordered states of Z_{2} spin-liquid, quantum dimer models on non-bipartite lattices, and Kitaev's toric code state, are characterized γ = log(2).

== See also ==
- Quantum topology
- Topological defect
- Topological order
- Topological quantum field theory
- Topological quantum number
- Topological string theory

== Sources ==
Calculations for specific topologically ordered states

- Haque, Masudul; Zozulya, Oleksandr; Schoutens, Kareljan (6 February 2007). "Entanglement Entropy in Fermionic Laughlin States". Physical Review Letters. 98 (6) 060401. arXiv:cond-mat/0609263. Bibcode:2007PhRvL..98f0401H. doi:10.1103/physrevlett.98.060401. ISSN 0031-9007. PMID 17358917. S2CID 5731929.
- Furukawa, Shunsuke; Misguich, Grégoire (5 June 2007). "Topological entanglement entropy in the quantum dimer model on the triangular lattice". Physical Review B. 75 (21) 214407. arXiv:cond-mat/0612227. Bibcode:2007PhRvB..75u4407F. doi:10.1103/physrevb.75.214407. ISSN 1098-0121. S2CID 118950876.
