= Topological quantum number =

Physical quantities with discrete values

In physics, a topological quantum number (also called topological charge) is any quantity, in a physical theory, that takes on only one of a discrete set of values, due to topological considerations. Most commonly, topological quantum numbers are topological invariants associated with topological defects or soliton-type solutions of some set of differential equations modeling a physical system, as the solitons themselves owe their stability to topological considerations. The specific "topological considerations" are usually due to the appearance of the fundamental group or a higher-dimensional homotopy group in the description of the problem, quite often because the boundary, on which the boundary conditions are specified, has a non-trivial homotopy group that is preserved by the differential equations. The topological quantum number of a solution is sometimes called the winding number of the solution, or, more precisely, it is the degree of a continuous mapping.

The concept of topological quantum numbers being created or destroyed during phase transitions emerged in condensed matter physics in the 1970s. The Kosterlitz-Thouless Transition demonstrated how topological defects, like vortices, could be created and annihilated during phase transitions in two-dimensional systems. Concurrently, in quantum field theory the 't Hooft-Polyakov monopole model demonstrated how topological structures, such as magnetic monopoles, could appear or disappear depending on the phase of a field, linking phase transitions to shifts in topological quantum numbers. In the 1980s, Haldane's theoretical model demonstrated that materials can possess topological quantum numbers like the Chern number, which can lead to different phases of matter. This concept was further explored with the development of topological phases, including the fractional quantum Hall effects and topological insulators.

== Particle physics ==
In particle physics, an example is given by the Skyrmion, for which the baryon number is a topological quantum number. The origin comes from the fact that the isospin is modelled by SU(2), which is isomorphic to the 3-sphere $S^3$ and $S^3$ inherits the group structure of SU(2) through its bijective association, so the isomorphism is in the category of topological groups. By taking real three-dimensional space, and closing it with a point at infinity, one also gets a 3-sphere. Solutions to Skyrme's equations in real three-dimensional space map a point in "real" (physical; Euclidean) space to a point on the 3-manifold SU(2). Topologically distinct solutions "wrap" the one sphere around the other, such that one solution, no matter how it is deformed, cannot be "unwrapped" without creating a discontinuity in the solution. In physics, such discontinuities are associated with infinite energy, and are thus not allowed.

In the above example, the topological statement is that the 3rd homotopy group of the three sphere is

$$\pi_3(S^3)=\mathbb{Z}$$

and so the baryon number can only take on integer values.

A generalization of these ideas is found in the Wess–Zumino–Witten model.

== Exactly solvable models ==
Additional examples can be found in the domain of exactly solvable models, such as the sine-Gordon equation, the Korteweg–de Vries equation, and the Ishimori equation. The one-dimensional sine-Gordon equation makes for a particularly simple example, as the fundamental group at play there is

$$\pi_1(S^1)=\mathbb{Z}$$

and so is literally a winding number: a circle can be wrapped around a circle an integer number of times. Quantum sine-Gordon model is equivalent to massive Thirring model. Fundamental excitations are fermions: topological quantum number $\mathbb{Z}$ is the number of fermions. After quantization of sine-Gordon model the topological charge become 'fractional'. Consistent consideration of ultraviolet renormalization shows that a fractional number of fermions repelled over the ultraviolet cutoff. So the $\mathbb{Z}$ gets multiplied by a fractional number depending on Planck constant.

== Solid state physics ==
In solid state physics, certain types of crystalline dislocations, such as screw dislocations, can be described by topological solitons. An example includes screw-type dislocations associated with Germanium whiskers.

== See also ==
- Inverse scattering transform
- Central charge
- Quantum invariant
- Quantum topology
- Topological defect
- Topological entropy in physics
- Topological order
- Topological quantum field theory
- Topological string theory
