= Topological defect =

Topologically stable solution of a partial differential equation

In mathematics and physics, solitons, topological solitons and topological defects are three closely related ideas, all of which signify structures in a physical system that are stable against perturbations. Solitons do not decay, dissipate, disperse or evaporate in the way that ordinary waves (or solutions or structures) might. The stability arises from an obstruction to the decay, which is explained by having the soliton belong to a different topological homotopy class or cohomology class than the base physical system. More simply: it is not possible to continuously transform the system with a soliton in it, to one without it. The mathematics behind topological stability is both deep and broad, and a vast variety of systems possessing topological stability have been described. This makes categorization somewhat difficult.

== Overview ==
The original soliton was observed in the 19th century, as a solitary water wave in a barge canal. It was eventually explained by noting that the Korteweg-De Vries (KdV) equation, describing waves in water, has homotopically distinct solutions. The mechanism of Lax pairs provided the needed topological understanding.

The general characteristic needed for a topological soliton to arise is that there should be some partial differential equation (PDE) having distinct classes of solutions, with each solution class belonging to a distinct homotopy class. In many cases, this arises because the base space, three-dimensional space or four-dimensional space, can be thought of as having the topology of a sphere, obtained by one-point compactification: adding a point at infinity. This is reasonable, as one is generally interested in solutions that vanish at infinity, and so are single-valued at that point. The range (codomain) of the variables in the differential equation can also be viewed as living in some compact topological space. As a result, the mapping from space(time) to the variables in the PDE is describable as a mapping from a sphere to a (different) sphere; the classes of such mappings are given by the homotopy groups of spheres.

To restate more plainly: solitons are found when one solution of the PDE cannot be continuously transformed into another; to get from one to the other would require "cutting" (as with scissors), but "cutting" is not a defined operation for solving PDE's. The cutting analogy arises because some solitons are described as mappings $U(1)\to U(1)$, where $U(1)\simeq S^1$ is the circle; the mappings arise in the circle bundle. Such maps can be thought of as winding a string around a stick: the string cannot be removed without cutting it. The most common extension of this winding analogy is to maps $S^3\to S^3$, where the first three-sphere $S^3$ stands for compactified 3D space, while the second stands for a vector field. (A three-vector, its direction plus length, can be thought of as specifying a point on a 3-sphere. The orientation of the vector specifies a subgroup of the orthogonal group $O(3)$; the length fixes a point. This has a double covering by the unitary group $SU(2)$, and $SU(2)\simeq S^3$.) Such maps occur in PDE's describing vector fields.

A topological defect is perhaps the simplest way of understanding the general idea: it is a soliton that occurs in a crystalline lattice, typically studied in the context of solid state physics and materials science. The prototypical example is the screw dislocation; it is a dislocation of the lattice that spirals around. It can be moved from one location to another by pushing it around, but it cannot be removed by simple continuous deformations of the lattice. (Some screw dislocations manifest so that they are directly visible to the naked eye: these are the germanium whiskers.) The mathematical stability comes from the non-zero winding number of the map of circles $S^1\to S^1;$ the stability of the dislocation leads to stiffness in the material containing it. One common manifestation is the repeated bending of a metal wire: this introduces more and more screw dislocations (as dislocation-anti-dislocation pairs), making the bent region increasingly stiff and brittle. Continuing to stress that region will overwhelm it with dislocations, and eventually lead to a fracture and failure of the material. This can be thought of as a phase transition, where the number of defects exceeds a critical density, allowing them to interact with one-another and "connect up", and thus disconnect (fracture) the whole. The idea that critical densities of solitons can lead to phase transitions is a recurring theme.

Vortices in superfluids and pinned vortex tubes in type-II superconductors provide examples of circle-map type topological solitons in fluids. More abstract examples include cosmic strings; these include both vortex-like solutions to the Einstein field equations, and vortex-like solutions in more complex systems, coupling to matter and wave fields. Tornados and vorticies in air are not examples of solitons: there is no obstruction to their decay; they will dissipate after a time. The mathematical solution describing a tornado can be continuously transformed, by weakening the rotation, until there is no rotation left. The details, however, are context-dependent: the Great Red Spot of Jupiter is a cyclone, for which soliton-type ideas have been offered up to explain its multi-century stability.

Topological defects were studied as early as the 1940's. More abstract examples arose in quantum field theory. The Skyrmion was proposed in the 1960's as a model of the nucleon (neutron or proton) and owed its stability to the mapping $S^3\to SU(2)$. In the 1980's, the instanton and related solutions of the Wess–Zumino–Witten models, rose to considerable popularity because these offered a non-perturbative take in a field that was otherwise dominated by perturbative calculations done with Feynmann diagrams. It provided the impetus for physicists to study the concepts of homotopy and cohomology, which were previously the exclusive domain of mathematics. Further development identified the pervasiveness of the idea: for example, the Schwarzschild solution and Kerr solution to the Einstein field equations (black holes) can be recognized as examples of topological gravitational solitons: this is the Belinski–Zakharov transform.

The terminology of a topological defect vs. a topological soliton, or even just a plain "soliton", varies according to the field of academic study. Thus, the hypothesized but unobserved magnetic monopole is a physical example of the abstract mathematical setting of a monopole; much like the Skyrmion, it owes its stability to belonging to a non-trivial homotopy class for maps of 3-spheres. For the monopole, the target is the magnetic field direction, instead of the isotopic spin direction. Monopoles are usually called "solitons" rather than "defects". Solitions are associated with topological invariants; as more than one configuration may be possible, these will be labelled with a topological charge. The word charge is used in the sense of charge in physics.

The mathematical formalism can be quite complicated. General settings for the PDE's include fiber bundles, and the behavior of the objects themselves are often described in terms of the holonomy and the monodromy. In abstract settings such as string theory, solitons are part and parcel of the game: strings can be arranged into knots, as in knot theory, and so are stable against being untied.

In general, a (quantum) field configuration with a soliton in it will have a higher energy than the ground state or vacuum state, and thus will be called a topological excitation. Although homotopic considerations prevent the classical field from being deformed into the ground state, it is possible for such a transition to occur via quantum tunneling. In this case, higher homotopies will come into play. Thus, for example, the base excitation might be defined by a map into the spin group. If quantum tunneling erases the distinction between this and the ground state, then the next higher group of homotopies is given by the string group. If the process repeats, this results in a walk up the Postnikov tower. These are theoretical hypotheses; demonstrating such concepts in actual lab experiments is a different matter entirely.

== Formal treatment ==
The existence of a topological defect can be demonstrated whenever the boundary conditions entail the existence of homotopically distinct solutions. Typically, this occurs because the boundary on which the conditions are specified has a non-trivial homotopy group which is preserved in differential equations; the solutions to the differential equations are then topologically distinct, and are classified by their homotopy class. Topological defects are not only stable against small perturbations, but cannot decay or be undone or be de-tangled, precisely because there is no continuous transformation that will map them (homotopically) to a uniform or "trivial" solution.

An ordered medium is defined as a region of space described by a function f(r) that assigns to every point in the region an order parameter, and the possible values of the order parameter space constitute an order parameter space. The homotopy theory of defects uses the fundamental group of the order parameter space of a medium to discuss the existence, stability and classifications of topological defects in that medium.

Suppose R is the order parameter space for a medium, and let G be a Lie group of transformations on R. Let H be the symmetry subgroup of G for the medium. Then, the order parameter space can be written as the Lie group quotient R = G/H.

If G is a universal cover for G/H then, it can be shown that π_{n}(G/H) = π_{n−1}(H), where π_{i} denotes the i-th homotopy group.

Various types of defects in the medium can be characterized by elements of various homotopy groups of the order parameter space. For example, (in three dimensions), line defects correspond to elements of π_{1}(R), point defects correspond to elements of π_{2}(R), textures correspond to elements of π_{3}(R). However, defects which belong to the same conjugacy class of π_{1}(R) can be deformed continuously to each other, and hence, distinct defects correspond to distinct conjugacy classes.

Poénaru and Toulouse showed that crossing defects get entangled if and only if they are members of separate conjugacy classes of π_{1}(R).

== Examples ==
Topological defects occur in partial differential equations and are believed to drive phase transitions in condensed matter physics.

The authenticity of a topological defect depends on the nature of the vacuum in which the system will tend towards if infinite time elapses; false and true topological defects can be distinguished if the defect is in a false vacuum and a true vacuum, respectively.

=== Solitary wave PDEs ===
Examples include the soliton or solitary wave which occurs in exactly solvable models, such as

- screw dislocations in crystalline materials,
- Skyrmion in quantum field theory,
- Magnetic skyrmion in condensed matter,
- Topological solitons of the Wess–Zumino–Witten model.

=== Lambda transitions ===
Topological defects in lambda transition universality class systems including:

- Screw/edge-dislocations in liquid crystals,
- Magnetic flux "tubes" known as fluxons in superconductors, and
- Vortices in superfluids.

== Cosmological defects ==
According to some models explored in the 1970s and 1980s, as the very early universe cools from an initial hot, dense state it triggered a series of phase transitions much like what happens in condensed-matter systems such as vortices in liquid helium. Topological defects in cosmology are consequences degenerate vacuum states of the universe, called the vacuum manifold, after a symmetry-breaking phase transition. Magnetic monopoles are one example of a stable topological defect predicted by grand unified theories of the early universe. Detailed measurements of the cosmic microwave background by the Wilkinson Microwave Anisotropy Probe provide strong evidence in favor of cosmic inflation for some predictions claimed by topological defect models. Models which combine these concepts remain viable.

=== Symmetry breaking ===
Depending on the nature of symmetry breaking, various solitons are believed to have formed in cosmological phase transitions in the early universe according to the Kibble-Zurek mechanism. The well-known topological defects are:

- Cosmic strings are one-dimensional lines that form when an axial or cylindrical symmetry is broken.
- Domain walls, two-dimensional membranes that form when a discrete symmetry is broken at a phase transition. These walls resemble the walls of a closed-cell foam, dividing the universe into discrete cells.
- Monopoles, cube-like defects that form when a spherical symmetry is broken, are predicted to have either positive or negative magnetic charge and therefore are commonly called "magnetic monopoles". The existence of a charge is theorized in order to make Maxwell's equations more symmetric.
- Textures form when larger, more complicated continuous global symmetries, such as SU(N) or O(N) for N ≥ 2, are completely broken. Unlike highly localized, stable defects like cosmic strings or monopoles, textures are delocalized, unstable configurations of the field that rapidly collapse and unwind at the speed of light.
- Skyrmions
- Extra dimensions and higher dimensions.

Other more complex hybrids of these defect types are also possible.

As the universe expanded and cooled, symmetries in the laws of physics began breaking down in regions that spread at the speed of light; topological defects occur at the boundaries of adjacent regions. The matter composing these boundaries is in an ordered phase, which persists after the phase transition to the disordered phase is completed for the surrounding regions.

=== Observation ===
Topological defects have not been identified by astronomers; however, certain types are not compatible with current observations. In particular, if domain walls and monopoles were present in the observable universe, they would result in significant deviations from what astronomers can see.

Because of these observations, the formation of defects within the observable universe is highly constrained, requiring special circumstances (see Inflation (cosmology)). On the other hand, cosmic strings have been suggested as providing the initial 'seed'-gravity around which the large-scale structure of the cosmos of matter has condensed. Textures are similarly benign. In late 2007, a cold spot in the cosmic microwave background provided evidence of a possible texture.

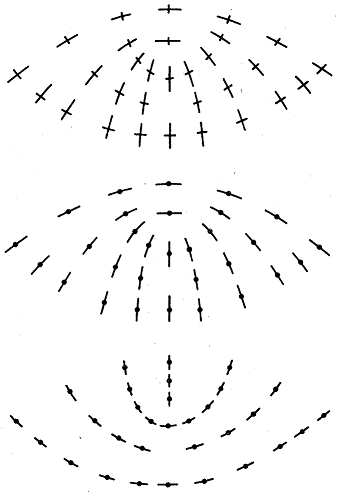
Classes of stable defects in biaxial nematics

== Condensed matter ==
In condensed matter physics, the theory of homotopy groups provides a natural setting for description and classification of defects in ordered systems. Topological methods have been used in several problems of condensed matter theory. Poénaru and Toulouse used topological methods to obtain a condition for line (string) defects in liquid crystals that can cross each other without entanglement. It was a non-trivial application of topology that first led to the discovery of peculiar hydrodynamic behavior in the A-phase of superfluid helium-3.

=== Stable defects ===
Homotopy theory is deeply related to the stability of topological defects. In the case of line defect, if the closed path can be continuously deformed into one point, the defect is not stable, and otherwise, it is stable.

Unlike in cosmology and field theory, topological defects in condensed matter have been experimentally observed. Ferromagnetic materials have regions of magnetic alignment separated by domain walls. Nematic and bi-axial nematic liquid crystals display a variety of defects including monopoles, strings, textures etc. In crystalline solids, the most common topological defects are dislocations, which play an important role in the prediction of the mechanical properties of crystals, especially crystal plasticity.

=== Topological defects in magnetic systems ===
In magnetic systems, topological defects include 2D defects such as skyrmions (with integer skyrmion charge), or 3D defects such as Hopfions (with integer Hopf index). The definition can be extended to include dislocations of the helimagnetic order, such as edge dislocations and screw dislocations (that have an integer value of the Burgers vector)

== Images ==
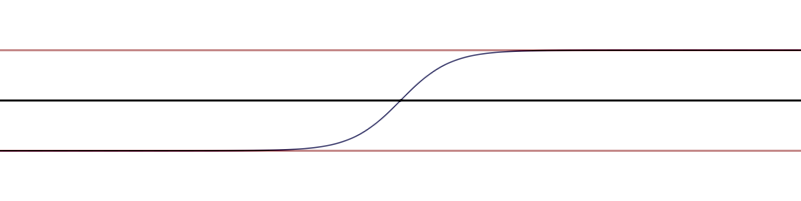
A static solution to $\mathcal{L} = \partial_\mu\phi\partial^\mu\phi - \left(\phi^2 - 1\right)^2$ in (1 + 1)-dimensional spacetime.

A soliton and an antisoliton colliding with velocities ±sinh(0.05) and annihilating.

== See also ==
- Condensed matter
- Differential equation
- Dislocation
- Quantum mechanics
- Quantum topology
- Quantum vortex
- Topological entropy in physics
- Topological manifold
- Topological order
- Topological quantum field theory
- Topological quantum number
- Topological string theory
- Topology
- Vector soliton
