= AKLT model =

Model in topological quantum mechanics

In condensed matter physics, the Affleck–Kennedy–Lieb–Tasaki (AKLT) model is an extension of the one-dimensional quantum Heisenberg spin model. The proposal and exact solution of this model by Ian Affleck, Elliott H. Lieb, Tom Kennedy and Hal Tasaki provided crucial insight into the physics of the spin-1 Heisenberg chain. It has also served as a useful example for such concepts as valence bond solid order, symmetry-protected topological order and matrix product state wavefunctions.

== Background ==
A major motivation for the AKLT model was the Majumdar–Ghosh chain. Because two out of every set of three neighboring spins in a Majumdar–Ghosh ground state are paired into a singlet, or valence bond, the three spins together can never be found to be in a spin 3/2 state. In fact, the Majumdar–Ghosh Hamiltonian is nothing but the sum of all projectors of three neighboring spins onto a 3/2 state.

The main insight of the AKLT paper was that this construction could be generalized to obtain exactly solvable models for spin sizes other than 1/2. Just as one end of a valence bond is a spin 1/2, the ends of two valence bonds can be combined into a spin 1, three into a spin 3/2, etc.

== Definition ==
Affleck et al. were interested in constructing a one-dimensional state with a valence bond between every pair of sites. Because this leads to two spin 1/2s for every site, the result must be the wavefunction of a spin 1 system.

For every adjacent pair of the spin 1s, two of the four constituent spin 1/2s are stuck in a total spin zero state. Therefore, each pair of spin 1s is forbidden from being in a combined spin 2 state. By writing this condition as a sum of projectors that favor the spin 2 state of pairs of spin 1s, AKLT arrived at the following Hamiltonian

$$\hat H =  \sum_{\langle ij \rangle} \textit{P}^{(2)}_{\langle ij \rangle} \sim \sum_j \vec{S}_j \cdot \vec{S}_{j+1} + \frac{1}{3} (\vec{S}_j \cdot \vec{S}_{j+1})^2$$

up to a constant, where the $\vec{S_i}$ are spin-1 operators, and $\textit{P}^{(2)}_{\langle ij \rangle}$ the local 2-point projector that favors the spin 2 state of an adjacent pair of spins.

This Hamiltonian is similar to the spin 1, one-dimensional quantum Heisenberg spin model but has an additional "biquadratic" spin interaction term.

== Ground state ==
By construction, the ground state of the AKLT Hamiltonian is the valence bond solid with a single valence bond connecting every neighboring pair of sites. Pictorially, this may be represented as

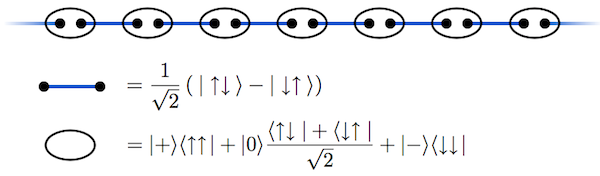

Here the solid points represent spin 1/2s which are put into singlet states. The lines connecting the spin 1/2s are the valence bonds indicating the pattern of singlets. The ovals are projection operators which "tie" together two spin 1/2s into a single spin 1, projecting out the spin 0 or singlet subspace and keeping only the spin 1 or triplet subspace. The symbols "+", "0" and "−" label the standard spin 1 basis states (eigenstates of the $S^z$ operator).

=== Spin 1/2 edge states ===
For the case of spins arranged in a ring (periodic boundary conditions) the AKLT construction yields a unique ground state. But for the case of an open chain, the first and last spin 1 have only a single neighbor, leaving one of their constituent spin 1/2s unpaired. As a result, the ends of the chain behave like free spin 1/2 moments even though the system consists of spin 1s only.

The spin 1/2 edge states of the AKLT chain can be observed in a few different ways. For short chains, the edge states mix into a singlet or a triplet giving either a unique ground state or a three-fold multiplet of ground states. For longer chains, the edge states decouple exponentially quickly as a function of chain length leading to a ground state manifold that is four-fold degenerate. By using a numerical method such as DMRG to measure the local magnetization along the chain, it is also possible to see the edge states directly and to show that they can be removed by placing actual spin 1/2s at the ends. It has even proved possible to detect the spin 1/2 edge states in measurements of a quasi-1D magnetic compound containing a small amount of impurities whose role is to break the chains into finite segments. In 2021, a direct spectroscopic signature of spin 1/2 edge states was found in isolated quantum spin chains built out of triangulene, a spin 1 polycyclic aromatic hydrocarbon.

=== Matrix product state representation ===
The simplicity of the AKLT ground state allows it to be represented in compact form as a matrix product state. This is a wavefunction of the form

$$|\Psi\rangle = \sum_{\{s\}} \operatorname{Tr}[A^{s_1} A^{s_2} \ldots A^{s_N}] |s_1 s_2 \ldots s_N\rangle.$$

Here the As are a set of three matrices labeled by $s_j$ and the trace comes from assuming periodic boundary conditions.

The AKLT ground state wavefunction corresponds to the choice:

$$A^{+} = +\sqrt{\tfrac{2}{3}}\ \sigma^{+}$$

$$A^{0} = -\sqrt{\tfrac{1}{3}}\ \sigma^{z}$$

$$A^{-} = -\sqrt{\tfrac{2}{3}}\ \sigma^{-}$$

where $\sigma$ is a Pauli matrix.

== Generalizations and extensions ==
The AKLT model has been solved on lattices of higher dimension, even in quasicrystals . The model has also been constructed for higher Lie algebras including SU(n), SO(n), Sp(n) and extended to the quantum groups SUq(n).
