= Texture (cosmology) =

In cosmology, a texture is a type of topological defect in the order parameter (typically a scalar field) of a field theory featuring spontaneous symmetry breaking. They are not as localized as the other defects, and are unstable. No textures have been definitively confirmed as having been detected, but their existence is compatible with current theories and observations of the universe.

In late 2007 a cold spot in the cosmic microwave background detected by the Wilkinson Microwave Anisotropy Probe was interpreted as possibly being a sign of a texture lying in that direction. A 2012 study found no evidence of textures.
