= String-net liquid =

Condensed matter physics model involving only closed loops

In condensed matter physics, a string-net is an extended object whose collective behavior has been proposed as a physical mechanism for topological order by Michael A. Levin and Xiao-Gang Wen. A particular string-net model may involve only closed loops; or networks of oriented, labeled strings obeying branching rules given by some gauge group; or still more general networks.

== Overview ==
The string-net model is claimed to show the derivation of photons, electrons, and U(1) gauge charge, small (relative to the Planck mass) but nonzero masses, and suggestions that the leptons, quarks, and gluons can be modeled in the same way. In other words, string-net condensation provides a unified origin for photons and electrons (or gauge bosons and fermions). It can be viewed as an origin of light and electron (or gauge interactions and Fermi statistics). However, their model does not account for the chiral coupling between the fermions and the SU(2) gauge bosons in the Standard Model.

For strings labeled by the positive integers, string-nets are the spin networks studied in loop quantum gravity. This has led to the proposal by Levin and Wen, and Smolin, Markopoulou and Konopka that loop quantum gravity's spin networks can give rise to the Standard Model of particle physics through this mechanism, along with fermi statistics and gauge interactions. To date, a rigorous derivation from LQG's spin networks to Levin and Wen's spin lattice has yet to be done, but the project to do so is called quantum graphity, and in a more recent paper, Tomasz Konopka, Fotini Markopoulou, Simone Severini argued that there are some similarities to spin networks (but not necessarily an exact equivalence) that gives rise to U(1) gauge charge and electrons in the string net mechanism.

== Examples ==
=== Z2 spin liquid ===
Z2 spin liquid obtained using slave-particle approach may be the first theoretical example of string-net liquid.

=== Toric code ===
The toric code is a two-dimensional spin-lattice that acts as a quantum error-correcting code. It is defined on a two-dimensional lattice with toric boundary conditions with a spin-1/2 on each link. It can be shown that the ground-state of the standard toric code Hamiltonian is an equal-weight superposition of closed-string states. Such a ground-state is an example of a string-net condensate which has the same topological order as the Z2 spin liquid above.
