= Environmental error =

An environmental error is a form of measurement error due to environmental influences on measuring equipment. Because scientific instruments cannot be completely isolated from their surroundings, fluctuations in the surrounding environment can lead to unexpected variation in measurements. Controlling the environmental conditions of an experiment, for example using an air conditioning system to maintain a constant laboratory temperature, can help to reduce error from environmental sources.

== Causes ==
The environmental errors have different causes including; temperature, humidity, magnetic field, vibrations in the Earth's surface, wind, and lighting.

== Minimizing ==
In high precision laboratories, even slight fluctuations in the environment can impact the data error substantially, and so extra care needs to be taken to keep the environment as stable as possible. Some tools used to accomplish this include optical tables for reducing vibrations and movement in optical systems, and thermostats to control the temperature of an experiment or sample.
