= Topological order =

Type of order at absolute zero

In physics, topological order describes a state or phase of matter that arises in a system with non-local interactions, such as entanglement in quantum mechanics, and floppy modes in elastic systems. Whereas classical phases of matter such as gases and solids correspond to microscopic patterns in the spatial arrangement of particles arising from short range interactions, topological orders correspond to patterns of long-range quantum entanglement. States with different topological orders (or different patterns of long range entanglements) cannot change into each other without a phase transition.

Technically, topological order occurs at zero temperature. Various topologically ordered states have interesting properties, such as (1) ground state degeneracy and fractional statistics or non-abelian group statistics that can be used to realize a topological quantum computer; (2) perfect conducting edge states that may have important device applications; (3) emergent gauge field and Fermi statistics that suggest a quantum information origin of elementary particles; (4) topological entanglement entropy that reveals the entanglement origin of topological order, etc. Topological order is important in the study of several physical systems such as spin liquids, and the quantum Hall effect, along with potential applications to fault-tolerant quantum computation.

Topological insulators and topological superconductors (beyond 1D) do not have topological order as defined above, their entanglements being only short-ranged, but are examples of symmetry-protected topological order.

== Background ==
Matter composed of atoms can have different properties and appear in different forms, such as solid, liquid, superfluid, etc. These various forms of matter are often called states of matter or phases. According to condensed matter physics and the principle of emergence, the different properties of materials generally arise from the different ways in which the atoms are organized in the materials. Those different organizations of the atoms (or other particles) are formally called the orders in the materials.

Atoms can organize in many ways which lead to many different orders and many different types of materials. Landau symmetry-breaking theory provides a general understanding of these different orders. It points out that different orders really correspond to different symmetries in the organizations of the constituent atoms. As a material changes from one order to another order (i.e., as the material undergoes a phase transition), what happens is that the symmetry of the organization of the atoms changes.

For example, atoms have a random distribution in a liquid, so a liquid remains the same as we displace atoms by an arbitrary distance. We say that a liquid has a continuous translation symmetry. After a phase transition, a liquid can turn into a crystal. In a crystal, atoms organize into a regular array (a lattice). A lattice remains unchanged only when we displace it by a particular distance (integer times a lattice constant), so a crystal has only discrete translation symmetry. The phase transition between a liquid and a crystal is a transition that reduces the continuous translation symmetry of the liquid to the discrete symmetry of the crystal. Similarly this holds for rotational symmetry. Such a change in symmetry is called symmetry breaking. The essence of the difference between liquids and crystals is therefore that the organizations of atoms have different symmetries in the two phases.

Landau symmetry-breaking theory has been a very successful theory. For a long time, physicists believed that Landau Theory described all possible orders in materials, and all possible (continuous) phase transitions.

== Discovery and characterization ==
However, since the late 1980s, it has become gradually apparent that Landau symmetry-breaking theory may not describe all possible orders. In an attempt to explain high temperature superconductivity the chiral spin state was introduced. At first, physicists still wanted to use Landau symmetry-breaking theory to describe the chiral spin state. They identified the chiral spin state as a state that breaks the time reversal and parity symmetries, but not the spin rotation symmetry. This should be the end of the story according to Landau's symmetry breaking description of orders. However, it was quickly realized that there are many different chiral spin states that have exactly the same symmetry, so symmetry alone was not enough to characterize different chiral spin states. This means that the chiral spin states contain a new kind of order that is beyond the usual symmetry description. The proposed, new kind of order was named "topological order". The name "topological order" is motivated by the low energy effective theory of the chiral spin states which is a topological quantum field theory (TQFT). New quantum numbers, such as ground state degeneracy (which can be defined on a closed space or an open space with gapped boundaries, including both Abelian topological orders and non-Abelian topological orders) and the non-Abelian geometric phase of degenerate ground states, were introduced to characterize and define the different topological orders in chiral spin states. More recently, it was shown that topological orders can also be characterized by topological entropy.

But experiments soon indicated that chiral spin states do not describe high-temperature superconductors, and the theory of topological order became a theory with no experimental realization. However, the similarity between chiral spin states and quantum Hall states allows one to use the theory of topological order to describe different quantum Hall states. Just like chiral spin states, different quantum Hall states all have the same symmetry and are outside the Landau symmetry-breaking description. One finds that the different orders in different quantum Hall states can indeed be described by topological orders, so the topological order does have experimental realizations.

The fractional quantum Hall (FQH) state was discovered in 1982 before the introduction of the concept of topological order in 1989. But the FQH state is not the first experimentally discovered topologically ordered state. The superconductor, discovered in 1911, is the first experimentally discovered topologically ordered state; it has Z_{2} topological order. (Note: Note that superconductivity can be described by the Ginzburg–Landau theory with dynamical U(1) EM gauge field, which is a Z_{2} gauge theory, that is, an effective theory of Z_{2} topological order. The prediction of the vortex state in superconductors was one of the main successes of Ginzburg–Landau theory with dynamical U(1) gauge field. The vortex in the gauged Ginzburg–Landau theory is nothing but the Z_{2} flux line in the Z_{2} gauge theory. The Ginzburg–Landau theory without the dynamical U(1) gauge field fails to describe the real superconductors with dynamical electromagnetic interaction. However, in condensed matter physics, superconductor usually refers to a state with non-dynamical EM gauge field. Such a state is a symmetry breaking state with no topological order.)

Although topologically ordered states usually appear in strongly interacting boson/fermion systems, a simple kind of topological order can also appear in free fermion systems. This kind of topological order corresponds to integral quantum Hall state, which can be characterized by the Chern number of the filled energy band if we consider integer quantum Hall state on a lattice. Theoretical calculations have proposed that such Chern numbers can be measured for a free fermion system experimentally. It is also well known that such a Chern number can be measured (maybe indirectly) by edge states.

The most important characterization of topological orders would be the underlying fractionalized excitations (such as anyons) and their fusion statistics and braiding statistics (which can go beyond the quantum statistics of bosons or fermions). Current research works show that the loop and string like excitations exist for topological orders in the 3+1 dimensional spacetime, and their multi-loop/string-braiding statistics are the crucial signatures for identifying 3+1 dimensional topological orders. The multi-loop/string-braiding statistics of 3+1 dimensional topological orders can be captured by the link invariants of particular topological quantum field theory in 4 spacetime dimensions.

== Mechanism ==
A large class of 2+1D topological orders is realized through a mechanism called string-net condensation. This class of topological orders can have a gapped edge and are classified by unitary fusion category (or monoidal category) theory. One finds that string-net condensation can generate infinitely many different types of topological orders, which may indicate that there are many different new types of materials remaining to be discovered.

The collective motions of condensed strings give rise to excitations above the string-net condensed states. Those excitations turn out to be gauge bosons. The ends of strings are defects which correspond to another type of excitations. Those excitations are the gauge charges and can carry Fermi or fractional statistics.

The condensations of other extended objects such as "membranes", "brane-nets", and fractals also lead to topologically ordered phases and "quantum glassiness".

== Mathematical formulation ==
We know that group theory is the mathematical foundation of symmetry-breaking orders. What is the mathematical foundation of topological order? It was found that a subclass of 2+1D topological orders—Abelian topological orders—can be classified by a K-matrix approach. The string-net condensation suggests that tensor category (such as fusion category or monoidal category) is part of the mathematical foundation of topological order in 2+1D. The more recent researches suggest that (up to invertible topological orders that have no fractionalized excitations):

- 2+1D bosonic topological orders are classified by unitary modular tensor categories.
- 2+1D bosonic topological orders with symmetry G are classified by G-crossed tensor categories.
- 2+1D bosonic/fermionic topological orders with symmetry G are classified by unitary braided fusion categories over symmetric fusion category, that has modular extensions. The symmetric fusion category Rep(G) for bosonic systems and sRep(G) for fermionic systems.

Topological order in higher dimensions may be related to n-Category theory. Quantum operator algebra is a very important mathematical tool in studying topological orders.

Some also suggest that topological order is mathematically described by extended quantum symmetry.

== Applications ==
The materials described by Landau symmetry-breaking theory have had a substantial impact on technology. For example, ferromagnetic materials that break spin rotation symmetry can be used as the media of digital information storage. A hard drive made of ferromagnetic materials can store gigabytes of information. Liquid crystals that break the rotational symmetry of molecules find wide application in display technology. Crystals that break translation symmetry lead to well defined electronic bands which in turn allow us to make semiconducting devices such as transistors. Different types of topological orders are even richer than different types of symmetry-breaking orders. This suggests their potential for novel applications.

=== Quantum Computation ===
One theorized application would be to use topologically ordered states as media for quantum computing in a technique known as topological quantum computing. A topologically ordered state is a state with complicated non-local quantum entanglement. The non-locality means that the quantum entanglement in a topologically ordered state is distributed among many different particles. As a result, the pattern of quantum entanglements cannot be destroyed by local perturbations. This significantly reduces the effect of decoherence. This suggests that if we use different quantum entanglements in a topologically ordered state to encode quantum information, the information may last much longer. The quantum information encoded by the topological quantum entanglements can also be manipulated by dragging the topological defects around each other. This process may provide a physical apparatus for performing quantum computations. Therefore, topologically ordered states may provide natural media for both quantum memory and quantum computation. Such realizations of quantum memory and quantum computation may potentially be made fault tolerant.

One class of systems that has been proposed to leverage topological order for quantum computation is the "self correcting quantum memories." These are systems whose error mitigation properties come not from active error correction but rather come from the survival of its ground state degeneracy at finite temperature. I.e. errors are mitigated from the device naturally returning to thermal equilibrium. A roadblock to this approach has been formalized by Matthew Hastings where he showed that any stabilizer models (the prevailing type of model used for quantum error correction) in three or higher spatial dimensions does not support topological order. It has recently been shown that topological order at finite temperature can exist in three spatial dimensions; however, as the existations of this system are fermionic anyons, it cannot be used as a quantum memory as fermion parity superselection does not allow for superpositions of the logical states.

=== Devices ===
Topologically ordered states in general have a special property that they contain non-trivial boundary states. In many cases, those boundary states become perfect conducting channel that can conduct electricity without generating heat. This can be another potential application of topological order in electronic devices.

Similarly to topological order, topological insulators also have gapless boundary states. The boundary states of topological insulators play a key role in the detection and the application of topological insulators. This observation naturally leads to a question: are topological insulators examples of topologically ordered states? In fact topological insulators are different from topologically ordered states defined in this article. Topological insulators only have short-ranged entanglements and have no topological order, while the topological order defined in this article is a pattern of long-range entanglement. Topological order is robust against any perturbations. It has emergent gauge theory, emergent fractional charge and fractional statistics. In contrast, topological insulators are robust only against perturbations that respect time-reversal and U(1) symmetries. Their quasi-particle excitations have no fractional charge and fractional statistics. Strictly speaking, topological insulator is an example of symmetry-protected topological (SPT) order, where the first example of SPT order is the Haldane phase of spin-1 chain. But the Haldane phase of spin-2 chain has no SPT order.

== Potential impact ==
Landau symmetry-breaking theory is a cornerstone of condensed matter physics. It is used to define the territory of condensed matter research. The existence of topological order appears to indicate that nature is much richer than Landau symmetry-breaking theory has so far indicated. So topological order opens up a new direction in condensed matter physics—a new direction of highly entangled quantum matter. We realize that quantum phases of matter (i.e. the zero-temperature phases of matter) can be divided into two classes: long range entangled states and short range entangled states. Topological order is the notion that describes the long range entangled states: topological order = pattern of long range entanglements. Short range entangled states are trivial in the sense that they all belong to one phase. However, in the presence of symmetry, even short range entangled states are nontrivial and can belong to different phases. Those phases are said to contain SPT order. SPT order generalizes the notion of topological insulator to interacting systems.

Some suggest that topological order (or more precisely, string-net condensation) in local bosonic (spin) models has the potential to provide a unified origin for photons, electrons and other elementary particles in our universe.

== See also ==
- AKLT model
- Fractionalization
- Herbertsmithite
- Implicate order
- Quantum topology
- Spin liquid
- String-net liquid
- Symmetry-protected topological order
- Topological defect
- Topological degeneracy
- Topological entropy in physics
- Topological photonics
- Topological quantum field theory
- Topological quantum number
- Topological string theory

== References by categories ==
=== Fractional quantum Hall states ===
- Tsui, D. C.; Stormer, H. L.; Gossard, A. C. (1982). "Two-Dimensional Magnetotransport in the Extreme Quantum Limit". Phys. Rev. Lett. 48 (22): 1559–62. Bibcode:1982PhRvL..48.1559T. doi:10.1103/physrevlett.48.1559.
- Laughlin, R. B. (1983). "Anomalous Quantum Hall Effect: An Incompressible Quantum Fluid with Fractionally Charged Excitations". Phys. Rev. Lett. 50 (18): 1395–98. Bibcode:1983PhRvL..50.1395L. doi:10.1103/physrevlett.50.1395. S2CID 120080343.

=== Chiral spin states ===
- Kalmeyer, V.; Laughlin, R. B. (2 November 1987). "Equivalence of the resonating-valence-bond and fractional quantum Hall states". Physical Review Letters. 59 (18): 2095–8. Bibcode:1987PhRvL..59.2095K. doi:10.1103/physrevlett.59.2095. PMID 10035416.
- Wen, X. G.; Wilczek, Frank; Zee, A. (1 June 1989). "Chiral spin states and superconductivity". Physical Review B. 39 (16): 11413–23. Bibcode:1989PhRvB..3911413W. doi:10.1103/PhysRevB.39.11413. PMID 9947970.

=== Early characterization of FQH states ===
- Off-diagonal long-range order, oblique confinement, and the fractional quantum Hall effect, S. M. Girvin and A. H. MacDonald, Phys. Rev. Lett., 58, 1252 (1987)
- Effective-Field-Theory Model for the Fractional Quantum Hall Effect, S. C. Zhang and T. H. Hansson and S. Kivelson, Phys. Rev. Lett., 62, 82 (1989)

=== Topological order ===
- Xiao-Gang Wen, Phys. Rev. B, 40, 7387 (1989), "Vacuum Degeneracy of Chiral Spin State in Compactified Spaces"
- Wen, Xiao-Gang (1990). "Topological Orders in Rigid States" (PDF). Int. J. Mod. Phys. B. 4 (2): 239. Bibcode:1990IJMPB...4..239W. doi:10.1142/S0217979290000139. Archived from the original (PDF) on 2011-07-20.
- Xiao-Gang Wen, Quantum Field Theory of Many Body Systems – From the Origin of Sound to an Origin of Light and Electrons, Oxford Univ. Press, Oxford, 2004.

=== Characterization of topological order ===
- D. Arovas and J. R. Schrieffer and F. Wilczek, Phys. Rev. Lett., 53, 722 (1984), "Fractional Statistics and the Quantum Hall Effect"
- Wen, Xiao-Gang; Niu, Qian (1990). "Ground state degeneracy of the FQH states in presence of random potential and on high genus Riemann surfaces" (PDF). Phys. Rev. B. 41 (13): 9377–96. Bibcode:1990PhRvB..41.9377W. doi:10.1103/physrevb.41.9377. PMID 9993283.
- Wen, Xiao-Gang (1991a). "Gapless Boundary Excitations in the FQH States and in the Chiral Spin States" (PDF). Phys. Rev. B. 43 (13): 11025–36. Bibcode:1991PhRvB..4311025W. doi:10.1103/physrevb.43.11025. PMID 9996836.
- Kitaev, Alexei; Preskill, John (24 March 2006). "Topological Entanglement Entropy". Physical Review Letters. 96 (11) 110404. arXiv:hep-th/0510092. Bibcode:2006PhRvL..96k0404K. doi:10.1103/physrevlett.96.110404. PMID 16605802. S2CID 18480266.
- Levin, Michael; Wen, Xiao-Gang (24 March 2006). "Detecting Topological Order in a Ground State Wave Function". Physical Review Letters. 96 (11) 110405. arXiv:cond-mat/0510613. Bibcode:2006PhRvL..96k0405L. doi:10.1103/physrevlett.96.110405. PMID 16605803. S2CID 206329868.

=== Effective theory of topological order ===
- Witten, E. (1989). "Quantum field theory and the Jones polynomial". Comm. Math. Phys. 121 (3): 351–399. Bibcode:1989CMaPh.121..351W. doi:10.1007/bf01217730. MR 0990772. S2CID 14951363. Zbl 0667.57005.

=== Mechanism of topological order ===
- Levin, Michael A.; Wen, Xiao-Gang (12 January 2005). "String-net condensation: A physical mechanism for topological phases". Physical Review B. 71 (4) 045110. arXiv:cond-mat/0404617. Bibcode:2005PhRvB..71d5110L. doi:10.1103/physrevb.71.045110. S2CID 51962817.
- Chamon, C (2005). "Quantum Glassiness in Strongly Correlated Clean Systems: An Example of Topological Overprotection". Phys. Rev. Lett. 94 (4) 040402. arXiv:cond-mat/0404182. Bibcode:2005PhRvL..94d0402C. doi:10.1103/PhysRevLett.94.040402. PMID 15783534. S2CID 25731669.
- Hamma, Alioscia; Zanardi, Paolo; Wen, Xiao-Gang (2005). "String and Membrane condensation on 3D lattices". Phys. Rev. B. 72 (3) 035307. arXiv:cond-mat/0411752. Bibcode:2005PhRvB..72c5307H. doi:10.1103/physrevb.72.035307. S2CID 118956379.
- Bombin, H.; Martin-Delgado, M. A. (7 February 2007). "Exact topological quantum order inD=3and beyond: Branyons and brane-net condensates". Physical Review B. 75 (7) 075103. arXiv:cond-mat/0607736. Bibcode:2007PhRvB..75g5103B. doi:10.1103/physrevb.75.075103. S2CID 119460756.

=== Quantum computing ===
- Nayak, Chetan; Simon, Steven H.; Stern, Ady; Freedman, Michael; Das Sarma, Sankar (2008). "Non-Abelian anyons and topological quantum computation". Reviews of Modern Physics. 80 (3): 1083–1159. arXiv:0707.1889. Bibcode:2008RvMP...80.1083N. doi:10.1103/RevModPhys.80.1083.
- Kitaev, Alexei Yu (2003). "Fault-tolerant quantum computation by anyons". Annals of Physics. 303 (1): 2–30. arXiv:quant-ph/9707021. Bibcode:2003AnPhy.303....2K. doi:10.1016/S0003-4916(02)00018-0. S2CID 119087885.
- Freedman, Michael H.; Kitaev, Alexei; Larsen, Michael J.; Wang, Zhenghan (2003). "Topological quantum computation". Bull. Amer. Math. Soc. 40: 31. arXiv:quant-ph/0101025. doi:10.1090/s0273-0979-02-00964-3.
- Dennis, Eric; Kitaev, Alexei; Landahl, Andrew; Preskill, John (2002). "Topological quantum memory". J. Math. Phys. 43 (9): 4452–4505. arXiv:quant-ph/0110143. Bibcode:2002JMP....43.4452D. doi:10.1063/1.1499754. S2CID 36673677.
- Ady Stern and Bertrand I. Halperin, Phys. Rev. Lett., 96, 016802 (2006), Proposed Experiments to probe the Non-Abelian nu=5/2 Quantum Hall State

=== Emergence of elementary particles ===
- Xiao-Gang Wen, Phys. Rev. D68, 024501 (2003), Quantum order from string-net condensations and origin of light and massless fermions
- Levin, Michael; Wen, Xiao-Gang (20 June 2003). "Fermions, strings, and gauge fields in lattice spin models". Physical Review B. 67 (24) 245316. arXiv:cond-mat/0302460. Bibcode:2003PhRvB..67x5316L. doi:10.1103/physrevb.67.245316. S2CID 29180411.
- Levin, Michael; Wen, Xiao-Gang (2005a). "Colloquium: Photons and electrons as emergent phenomena". Reviews of Modern Physics. 77 (3): 871–9. arXiv:cond-mat/0407140. Bibcode:2005RvMP...77..871L. doi:10.1103/RevModPhys.77.871. S2CID 117563047. See also Levin, Michael; Wen, Xiao-Gang (2006a). "Quantum ether: Photons and electrons from a rotor model". Physical Review B. 73 (3) 035122. arXiv:hep-th/0507118. Bibcode:2006PhRvB..73c5122L. doi:10.1103/PhysRevB.73.035122. S2CID 119481786.
- Zheng-Cheng Gu and Xiao-Gang Wen, gr-qc/0606100, A lattice bosonic model as a quantum theory of gravity,

=== Quantum operator algebra ===
- Yetter, David N. (1993). "TQFT'S from Homotopy 2-Types". Journal of Knot Theory and Its Ramifications. 2 (1): 113–123. doi:10.1142/s0218216593000076.
- Landsman N. P. and Ramazan B., Quantization of Poisson algebras associated to Lie algebroids, in Proc. Conf. on Groupoids in Physics, Analysis and Geometry(Boulder CO, 1999)', Editors J. Kaminker et al.,159{192 Contemp. Math. 282, Amer. Math. Soc., Providence RI, 2001, (also math{ph/001005.)
- Non-Abelian Quantum Algebraic Topology (NAQAT) 20 Nov. (2008),87 pages, Baianu, I.C.
- Levin A. and Olshanetsky M., Hamiltonian Algebroids and deformations of complex structures on Riemann curves, hep-th/0301078v1.
- Xiao-Gang Wen, Yong-Shi Wu and Y. Hatsugai., Chiral operator product algebra and edge excitations of a FQH droplet (pdf),Nucl. Phys. B422, 476 (1994): Used chiral operator product algebra to construct the bulk wave function, characterize the topological orders and calculate the edge states for some non-Abelian FQH states.
- Xiao-Gang Wen and Yong-Shi Wu., Chiral operator product algebra hidden in certain FQH states (pdf),Nucl. Phys. B419, 455 (1994): Demonstrated that non-Abelian topological orders are closely related to chiral operator product algebra (instead of conformal field theory).
- Non-Abelian theory.
- Baianu, I. C. (2007). "A Non-Abelian, Categorical Ontology of Spacetimes and Quantum Gravity". Axiomathes. 17 (3–4): 353–408. doi:10.1007/s10516-007-9012-1. S2CID 3909409..
- R. Brown, P.J. Higgins, P. J. and R. Sivera, "Nonabelian Algebraic Topology: filtered spaces, crossed complexes, cubical homotopy groupoids" EMS Tracts in Mathematics Vol 15 (2011),
- A Bibliography for Categories and Algebraic Topology Applications in Theoretical Physics
- Quantum Algebraic Topology (QAT)
