= Quantum topology =

Study of quantum mechanics through low-dimensional topology

Quantum topology is a branch of mathematics that connects quantum mechanics with low-dimensional topology.

Dirac notation provides a viewpoint of quantum mechanics which becomes amplified into a framework that can embrace the amplitudes associated with topological spaces and the related embedding of one space within another such as knots and links in three-dimensional space. This bra–ket notation of kets and bras can be generalised, becoming maps of vector spaces associated with topological spaces that allow tensor products.

Topological entanglement involving linking and braiding can be intuitively related to quantum entanglement.

== See also ==
- Topological quantum field theory
- Reshetikhin–Turaev invariant
