= Luis Fernando Alday =

British mathematician

- Born: October 17, 1977 (age 48); San Rafael, Mendoza, Argentina
- Known for: AGT correspondence
- Awards: Royal Society Wolfson Fellowship (2012); Whitehead Prize (2013)

Academic background
- Education: Balseiro Institute; International School for Advanced Studies; Institute for Advanced Studies; Utrecht University

Academic work
- Discipline: Mathematical physicist
- Institutions: University of Oxford; Mathematical Institute; Hertford College (2010–2020); Wadham College (2020–present)

Luis Fernando Alday FRS is an Argentine-British mathematician, and the Rouse Ball Professor of Mathematics at the University of Oxford and Head of the Mathematical Physics Group.

== Career ==
Alday was born on 17 October 1977 in San Rafael, Mendoza, but he spent most of his youth in Arrecifes. He was the eldest child among three siblings. He graduated from the Balseiro Institute at the National University of Cuyo in Argentina in 2001, after studying for the first two years at the National University of La Plata. He completed his PhD at the International School for Advanced Studies in Trieste in 2004. He was a member of the Institute for Advanced Study (IAS) in Princeton for Spring 2007, and from September 2008 to September 2010. At the IAS, he collaborated with Juan Maldacena, a fellow Argentine physicist and Balseiro graduate. Alday joined the University of Oxford in 2010 after post-doctorate studies at the IAS and Utrecht University. Since then, he has been associated with Hertford College. His research interests include a bootstrap approach to conformal field theories and string theory, several aspects of the AdS/CFT duality, four-dimensional N=2 super-symmetric theories and their relation to conformal field theories, and the exact computation of observables in super-symmetric gauge theories. He received a Royal Society Wolfson Fellowship in 2012, and the Whitehead Prize of the London Mathematical Society in 2013. Alday has also received two grants from the European Research Council.

Alday's research focuses on providing mathematical tools for applications in areas of physics such as quantum field theory and quantum gravity. He was appointed the Rouse Ball Professor of Mathematics and head of the Mathematical Physics Group in 2020. Alday was elected a Fellow of the Royal Society in May 2022. He was recognised as such for two groundbreaking papers. The first provides a method for computing "scattering amplitudes in planar super-symmetric Yang–Mills theory at strong coupling". The second paper introduced the concept of AGT correspondence, partly named after Alday and developed jointly with Davide Gaiotto and Yuji Tachikawa, "relates four dimensional supersymmetric gauge theories to two dimensional conformal field theories". At the time of his election to the Royal Society, he was a Fellow of Wadham College and associated with the Oxford Mathematical Institute.

== Sources ==
- Iannini, Camila (16 December 2020). "Quién es Fernando Alday, el científico argentino que da "cátedra" en Oxford" [Who Is Fernando Alday, The Argentine Scientist Who Teaches At Oxford?]. Perfil (in Spanish).
