= Davide Gaiotto =

Italian mathematical physicist (born 1977)

- Born: 11 March 1977 (age 49)
- Education: Scuola Normale Superiore
- Known for: AGT correspondence Spectral network Higher form symmetries
- Awards: Gribov Medal (2011); New Horizons in Physics Prize (2013)
- Scientific career
- Fields: Physics
- Workplaces: Perimeter Institute
- Thesis: (2004)

Davide Silvano Achille Gaiotto (born 11 March 1977) is an Italian mathematical physicist who deals with quantum field theories and string theory. He received the Gribov Medal by the European Physical Society in 2011 and the New Horizons in Physics Prize in 2013.

== Biography ==
Gaiotto won 1996 the silver medal as an Italian participant in the International Mathematical Olympiad and in 1995 the gold medal at the International Physics Olympiad in Canberra. He was an undergraduate student at Scuola Normale Superiore in Pisa from 1996 to 2000. He then moved to Princeton University, where for his graduate studies he worked under the supervision of Leonardo Rastelli, receiving his PhD in 2004. From 2004 to 2007 he was a post-doctoral researcher at Harvard University, and then from 2007 to 2011 at the Institute for Advanced Study. Since 2011 he has been working at the Perimeter Institute for Theoretical Physics in Waterloo, Ontario.

He introduced new techniques in the study and design of four-dimensional (N = 2) supersymmetric conformal field theories. He constructed from M5-branes, which are wound around Riemann surfaces with punctures. This led to new insights into the dynamics of four-dimensional (supersymmetric) gauge theories. With Juan Maldacena he studied these gauge theories using the AdS/CFT correspondence. In 2008, he as well as Gregory Moore and Andrew Neitzke gave an alternative construction of the Ooguri–Vafa metric, which was first constructed with the Gibbons–Hawking ansatz. In 2010, together with Yuji Tachikawa and Luis Alday, he developed the AGT correspondence (named after the authors), a duality in the 6D (2,0) superconformal field theory with compactification on a surface to a conformal field theory on the surface (Liouville field theory).

In 2015, he published with Kapustin, Seiberg and Willett a paper initiating the trend of studying non-invertible symmetries, also known as higher form symmetries, where a q-form global symmetry is a global symmetry for which the charged operators are of space-time dimension q.
