= Peter B. Gilkey =

American mathematician

Peter Belden Gilkey (born February 27, 1946, in Utica, New York) is an American mathematician, working in differential geometry and global analysis.

Gilkey graduated from Yale University with a master 's degree in 1967 and received a doctoral degree in 1972 from the Harvard University under the supervision of Louis Nirenberg (Curvature and the Eigenvalues of the Laplacian for Geometrical Elliptic Complexes). From 1971 to 1972 he was an instructor in computer science at the New York University and from 1972 to 1974 was a lecturer at the University of California, Berkeley. From 1974 to 1980 he was assistant professor at Princeton University, he spent one year at U.S.C., and in 1981 he became associate professor and in 1985 professor at the University of Oregon.

He wrote a textbook on the Atiyah–Singer index theorem. In 1975 he was Sloan Fellow. He is a fellow of the American Mathematical Society.

Gilkey retired from the University of Oregon in June 2021 and is now a Professor Emeritus.

== Writings ==
- Invariance Theory, the Heat Equation and the Atiyah-Singer-Index theorem. Publish or Perish. 1984. Online
- Asymptotic formulae in spectral geometry. Studies in Advanced Mathematics. Vol. 43. Boca Raton, Florida: Chapman & Hall/CRC. 2004. pp. viii+ 304. ISBN 1-58488-358-8.
- With Tohru Eguchi, Andrew J. Hanson Gravitation, Gauge Theories and Differential Geometry, Physics Reports, Volume 66, 1980, pp. 213–393
