= Kohta Murase =

Japanese physicist and an academic

Academic background
- Education: B.S., Physics; M.S., Physics; Ph.D., Physics

Academic work
- Institutions: Pennsylvania State University; Yukawa Institute for Theoretical Physics

Kohta Murase (Japanese: 村瀬孔大) is a Japanese physicist and academic. He is a Professor at Pennsylvania State University. He is also an Adjunct Professor at Yukawa Institute for Theoretical Physics.

Murase is known for his works on astroparticle physics and high-energy astrophysics. He is the recipient of the 2017 Alfred P. Sloan Research Fellowship. He also has received the Nishinomiya Yukawa Memorial Prize in 2019.

== Education ==
Murase earned his B.S. in Physics from the University of Tokyo in 2005, followed by an M.S. in Physics from Kyoto University in 2007. He later obtained his Ph.D. in Physics from Kyoto University in 2010.

== Career ==
After he earned his Ph.D. in 2010, Murase became the JSPS Postdoctoral Fellow for Research Abroad and CCAPP Senior Fellow at the Ohio State University. He was a member of the School of Natural Sciences at the Institute for Advanced Study in Princeton, first as a NASA/STScI Hubble Fellow and again as a visiting professor supported by the J. Robert Oppenheimer Endowed Fund. He joined the faculty in 2015 as an Assistant Professor at Pennsylvania State University, a position he held until 2021. During this period, he also served as an Adjunct Associate Professor at the Yukawa Institute for Theoretical Physics. At the Pennsylvania State University, he was promoted to Associate Professor in 2021 and served in that role until 2024. Since 2024, he has been a Professor at Pennsylvania State University and an Adjunct Professor at the Yukawa Institute for Theoretical Physics.

== Research ==
Murase's research has focused on astroparticle physics, especially multi-messenger particle astrophysics with neutrinos, gamma rays, cosmic rays, gravitational waves, and dark matter. He has investigated extreme astrophysical sources involving black holes and neutron stars, including active galactic nuclei and supernovae.

== Awards and honors ==
- 2015 - Young Astronomer Award, Astronomical Society of Japan
- 2016 - Incentive Award of Cosmic Ray Physics, CRC Japan
- 2016 - Young Scientist Award, Physical Society of Japan
- 2017 - Alfred P. Sloan Research Fellowship
- 2019 - Nishinomiya-Yukawa Memorial Prize

== Selected articles ==
- Murase, K., Ahlers, M., & Lacki, B. C. (2013). Testing the hadronuclear origin of PeV neutrinos observed with IceCube. Physical Review D—Particles, Fields, Gravitation, and Cosmology, 88(12), 121301.
- Murase, K., Guetta, D., & Ahlers, M. (2016). Hidden cosmic-ray accelerators as an origin of TeV-PeV cosmic neutrinos. Physical Review Letters, 116(7), 071101.
- Murase, K., Kimura, S.S., & Meszaros, P. (2020). Hidden Cores of Active Galactic Nuclei as the Origin of Medium-Energy Neutrinos: Critical Tests with the MeV Gamma-Ray Connection. Physical Review Letters, 125, 011101.
