= Andrew Neitzke =

American mathematician

- Education: Harvard University; Princeton University
- Known for: Spectral Networks
- Scientific career
- Fields: Mathematics, physics
- Workplaces: Yale University; University of Texas at Austin
- Doctoral advisor: Cumrun Vafa

Andrew Neitzke is an American mathematician and theoretical physicist, at Yale University. He works in mathematical physics, mainly in geometric problems arising from physics, particularly from supersymmetric quantum field theory.

== Education and career ==
Neitzke earned his AB at Princeton University as valedictorian. After one year as a Marshall Scholar for Part III of the Mathematical Tripos at the University of Cambridge, he earned his doctorate in 2005 at Harvard University under the supervision of Cumrun Vafa.

After postdoctoral research at the Institute for Advanced Study and Harvard University, he became an assistant professor at the University of Texas at Austin in 2009, and was promoted to full professor by 2019. He moved to Yale University in 2020, at first as associate professor but later in 2020 becoming full professor again.

In 2008, he as well as Davide Gaiotto and Gregory Moore gave an alternative construction of the Ooguri–Vafa metric, which was first constructed with the Gibbons–Hawking ansatz.

== Recognition ==
In 2018, he became a fellow of the American Mathematical Society "for contributions to research on the boundary of geometry and physics".
