= Swampland (physics) =

Low energy theories not compatible with string theory

In physics, the term swampland refers to effective low-energy physical theories which are not compatible with quantum gravity. This is in contrast with the so-called "string theory landscape" that are known to be compatible with string theory, which is hypothesized to be a consistent quantum theory of gravity. In other words, the Swampland is the set of consistent-looking theories with no consistent ultraviolet completion with the addition of gravity.

Developments in string theory also suggest that the string theory landscape of false vacuum is vast, so it is natural to ask if the landscape is as vast as allowed by anomaly-free effective field theories. The Swampland program aims to delineate the theories of quantum gravity by identifying the universal principles shared among all theories compatible with gravitational UV completion. The program was initiated by Cumrun Vafa who argued that string theory suggests that the Swampland is in fact much larger than the string theory landscape.

Quantum gravity differs from quantum field theory in several key ways, including locality and UV/IR decoupling. In quantum gravity, a local structure of observables is emergent rather than fundamental. A concrete example of the emergence of locality is AdS/CFT, where the local quantum field theory description in bulk is only an approximation that emerges within certain limits of the theory. Moreover, in quantum gravity, it is believed that different spacetime topologies can contribute to the gravitational path integral, which suggests that spacetime emerges due to one saddle being more dominant. Moreover, in quantum gravity, UV and IR are closely related. This connection is manifested in black hole thermodynamics, where a semiclassical IR theory calculates the black hole entropy, which captures the density of gravitational UV states known as black holes. In addition to general arguments based on black hole physics, developments in string theory also suggests that there are universal principles shared among all the theories in the string landscape.

The swampland conjectures are a set of conjectured criteria for theories in the quantum gravity landscape. The criteria are often motivated by black hole physics, universal patterns in string theory, and non-trivial self-consistencies among each other.

== No global symmetry conjecture ==
The no global symmetry conjecture states that any symmetry in quantum gravity is either broken or gauged. In other words, there are no accidental symmetries in quantum gravity. The original motivation for the conjecture goes back to black holes. Hawking radiation of a generic black hole is only sensitive to charges that can be measured outside of the black hole, which are charges under gauge symmetries. Therefore, it is believed that the process of black hole formation and evaporation violates any conservation which is not protected by gauge symmetry. The no global symmetry conjecture can also be derived from AdS/CFT correspondence in AdS.

=== Generalization to higher-form symmetries ===
The modern understanding of global and gauge symmetries allows for a natural generalization of the no-global symmetry conjectures to higher-form symmetries. A conventional symmetry (0-form symmetry) is a map that acts on point-like operators. For example, a free complex scalar field $\phi(x)$ has a $U(1)$ symmetry which acts on the operator $\hat\phi(x)$ as $\hat\phi(x)\rightarrow e^{i\alpha}\hat\phi(x)$, where $\alpha$ is a constant. One can use the symmetry to associate an operator $\mathcal{O}_g(\Sigma)$ to any symmetry element $g$ and codimension-1 hypersurface $\Sigma$ such that $\mathcal{O}_g(\Sigma)$ maps any charged local operator such as $\hat\phi(x)$ to $g(\hat\phi(x))$ if the point $x$ is enclosed (or linked) by $\Sigma$. By definition, the action of the operator $\mathcal{O}_g(\Sigma)$ does not change by a continuous deformation of $\Sigma$ as long as $\Sigma$ does not hit a charged operator. Due to this feature, the operator $\mathcal{O}$ is called a topological operator. If the algebra governing the fusion of the symmetry operators has an element without an inverse, the corresponding symmetry is called a non-invertible symmetry.

The above definitions can be generalized to higher dimensional charged operators. A collection of codimension-$(p+1)$ topological operators which act non-trivially on dimension-$p$ operators and are closed under fusion is called a $p$-form symmetry. Compactification of a higher dimensional theory with a $p$-form symmetry on a $p$-dimensional torus can map the higher form symmetry to a $0$-form symmetry in the lower dimensional theory. Therefore, it is believed that higher-form global symmetries are also excluded from quantum gravity.

Note that gauge symmetry does not satisfy this definition since, in the process of gauging, any local charged operator is excluded from the physical spectrum.

=== Cobordism conjecture ===
Global symmetries are closely connected to conservation laws. The no-global symmetry conjecture essentially states that any conservation law that is not protected by a gauge symmetry can be violated via a dynamical process. This intuition leads to the cobordism conjecture.

Consider a gravitational theory that can be put on two backgrounds with $d$ non-compact dimensions and internal geometries $M$ and $N$. Cobordism conjecture states that there must be a dynamical process which connects the two backgrounds to each other. In other words, there must exist a domain wall in the lower-dimensional theory which separates the two backgrounds. This resembles the idea of cobordism in mathematics, which interpolates between two manifolds by connecting them using a higher dimensional manifold.

== Completeness of spectrum hypothesis ==
The completeness of spectrum hypothesis conjectures that in quantum gravity, the spectrum of charges under any gauge symmetry is completely realized. This conjecture is universally satisfied in string theory, but is also motivated by black hole physics. The entropy of charged black holes is non-zero. Since the exponential of entropy counts the number of states, the non-zero entropy of black holes suggests that for sufficiently high charges, any charge is realized by at least one black hole state.

=== Relation to no-global symmetry conjecture ===
The completeness of spectrum hypothesis is closely related to the no global symmetry conjecture.

Example:

Consider a $U(1)$ gauge symmetry. In the absence of charged particles, the theory has a 1-form global symmetry $(\mathbb{R},+)$. For any number $c\in\mathbb{R}$ and any codimension 2 surface $\Sigma$, the symmetry operator $\mathcal{O}_c(\Sigma)$ multiplies a Wilson line that links with $\Sigma$ by $e^{icn}$, where the charge associated with the Wilson line is $n$ units of the fundamental charge.

In the presence of charged particles, Wilson lines can break up. Suppose there is a charged particle with charge $k$, the Wilson lines can change their charges for multiples of $k$. Therefore, some of the symmetry operators $\mathcal{O}_c(\Sigma)$ are no longer well-defined. However, if we take $k$ to be the smallest charge, the values $c\in\{1/k,2/k,...,k/k\}$ give rise to well defined symmetry operators. Therefore, a $\mathbb{Z}_k$ part of the global symmetry survives. To avoid any global symmetry, $k$ must be 1 which means all charges appear in the spectrum.

The above argument can be generalized to discrete and higher-dimensional symmetries. The completeness of spectrum follows from the absence of generalized global symmetry which also includes non-invertible symmetries.

== Weak gravity conjecture ==
The weak gravity conjecture (WGC) is a conjecture regarding the strength gravity can have in a theory of quantum gravity relative to the gauge forces in that theory. It roughly states that gravity should be the weakest force in any consistent theory of quantum gravity.

=== Original conjecture ===
The weak gravity conjecture postulates that every black hole must decay unless it is protected by supersymmetry. Suppose there is a $U(1)$ gauge symmetry, there is an upper bound on the charge of the black holes with a given mass. The black holes that saturate that bound are extremal black holes. The extremal black holes have zero Hawking temperature. However, whether or not a black hole with a charge and a mass that exactly satisfies the extremality condition exists depends on the quantum theory. But given the high entropy of the large extremal black holes, there must exist many states with charges and masses that are arbitrarily close to the extremality condition. Suppose the black hole emits a particle with charge $q$ and mass $m$. For the remaining black hole to remain subextremal, we must have $|q|<m$ in Planck units where the extremality condition takes the form $|Q|=M$.

=== Mild version ===
Given that black holes are the natural extension of particles beyond a certain mass, it is natural to assume that there must also be black holes with a charge-to-mass ratio that is greater than that of very large black holes. In other words, the correction to the extremality condition $|Q|=M+\delta M$ must be such that $\delta M>0$.

=== Higher dimensional generalization ===
Weak gravity conjecture can be generalized to higher-form gauge symmetries. The generalization postulates that for any higher-form gauge symmetry, there exists a brane which has a charge-to-mass ratio that exceeds the charge-to-mass ratio of the extremal branes.

== Distance conjecture ==
String dualities have played a crucial role in developing the modern understanding of string theory by providing a non-perturbative window into UV physics. In string theory, when one takes the vacuum expectation values of the scalar fields of a theory to a certain limit, a dual description always emerges. An example of this is T-duality, where there are two dual descriptions to understand a string theory with an internal geometry of a circle. However, each perturbative description becomes valid in a different regime of the parameter space. The circle's radius manifests itself as a scalar field in the lower dimensional theory. If one takes the value of this scalar field to infinity, the resulting theory can be described by the original higher dimensional theory. The new description includes a tower of light states corresponding to the Kaluza-Klein (KK) particles. On the other hand, if we take the size of the circle to zero, the strings that wind around the circle will become light. T-duality is the statement that there exists an alternative description which captures these light winding states as KK particles. Note that in the absence of a string, there is no reason to believe any states should become light in the limit where the size of the circle goes to zero. Distance conjecture quantifies the above observation and states that it must happen at any infinite distance limit of the parameter space.

=== Original conjecture ===
If one takes the vacuum expectation value of the scalar fields to infinity, there exists a tower of light and weakly coupled states whose mass in Planck units goes to zero. Moreover, the mass of the particles depends on the canonical distance travelled in the moduli space $\Delta\phi$ as $m\sim M_0\exp(-\lambda\Delta\phi)$, where $M_0$ and $\lambda$ are constants. Moreover, there is a universal dimension-dependent lower bound on $\lambda$.

The canonical distance between two points in the target space for scalar expectations values (moduli space) is measured using the canonical metric $G$, which is defined by the kinetic term in action.

$$S=\int d^dx \sqrt{g}\frac{1}{2}G_{ij}\partial_\mu\phi^i\partial^\mu\phi^j+...$$

=== Emergent string conjecture ===
A stronger version of the original distance conjecture additionally postulates that the lightest tower of states at any infinite distance limit is either a KK tower or a string tower. In other words, the leading tower of states can either be understood via dimensional reduction of a higher dimensional theory (just like the example provided above) or as excitations of a weakly coupled string.

This conjecture is often further strengthened by imposing the string to be a fundamental string.

=== The sharpened distance conjecture ===
The sharpened distance conjecture states that in $d$ spacetime dimensions, $\lambda\geq1/\sqrt{d-2}$.
