= Rajesh Gopakumar =

Indian physicist

- Rajesh Gopakumar at Harvard University
- Born: 14 December 1967 (age 58); Kolkata, India
- Citizenship: India
- Education: IIT Kanpur (BSc, MSc); Princeton University (PhD)
- Known for: Gopakumar–Vafa duality Gopakumar–Vafa invariant
- Spouse: Rukmini Dey
- Awards: Shanti Swarup Bhatnagar Award, ICTP Prize
- Scientific career
- Fields: String Theory, Theoretical Physics
- Workplaces: International Centre for Theoretical Sciences; Harish-Chandra Research Institute; Institute for Advanced Study
- Doctoral advisor: David Gross

Rajesh Gopakumar (born 1967) is an Indian theoretical physicist and the director of the International Centre for Theoretical Sciences (ICTS-TIFR) in Bangalore, India. He was previously a professor at Harish-Chandra Research Institute (HRI) in Prayagraj, India. He is known for his work on topological string theory.

== Background ==
Gopakumar was born in 1967 to Jaishree and G. Gopakumar in Kolkata. His family hails from the southern Indian state of Kerala. He has the distinction of securing All Indian Rank 1 in the examination for IIT-JEE in 1987.

Gopakumar obtained his integrated M.Sc. degree in physics from the prestigious IIT Kanpur in 1992. He completed his Ph.D. from Princeton University in 1997 under the supervision of David Gross. After a few years as a research associate at Harvard University, he joined HRI in 2001. He was also a visiting fellow at the Institute for Advanced Study, Princeton, New Jersey from 2001 to 2004.

He is married to Rukmini Dey, a Professor of Mathematical Physics and Geometry at ICTS-TIFR.

== Research ==
Gopakumar is a string theorist. Earlier on in his career, his research was primarily focused on large N gauge theories with David Gross, noncommutative gauge theories with Andrew Strominger and Shiraz Minwalla, and topological string theory and gauge/geometry correspondence with Cumrun Vafa and is particularly known for proposing the Gopakumar–Vafa duality and Gopakumar–Vafa invariants.

Later, his work focused on attempts to derive the AdS/CFT correspondence, and on minimal model holography (with Matthias Gaberdiel). In recent years, he has made important contributions to higher spin theories and their connections with string theory (with Matthias Gaberdiel). He has also recently worked on the Conformal bootstrap.

== Awards ==
- B.M. Birla Science Prize in Physics, 2004
- ICTP Prize, 2006
- Shanti Swarup Bhatnagar Award, 2009
- TWAS Prize in Physics, 2013

He was named Fellow of the Global Young Academy of Scientists for 2010. He is a member of the Indian National Science Academy, and the Indian Academy of Sciences.

== Selected publications ==
- Dijkgraaf, Robbert; Gopakumar, Rajesh; Ooguri, Hiroshi; Vafa, Cumrun (2006). "Baby universes and string theory". International Journal of Modern Physics D. 15 (10): 1581–1586. Bibcode:2006IJMPD..15.1581D. doi:10.1142/s0218271806008978. S2CID 199676528.
- David, Justin R.; Gopakumar, Rajesh (17 January 2007). "From spacetime to worldsheet: Four point correlators". Journal of High Energy Physics. 0701:063 (1): 063. arXiv:hep-th/0606078. Bibcode:2007JHEP...01..063D. doi:10.1088/1126-6708/2007/01/063. S2CID 8336127.
- List of R. Gopakumar's Publications
