= WGC =

WGC may refer to:

- Welwyn Garden City, town in Hertfordshire, England
- Welwyn Garden City railway station, Hertfordshire, England, by National Rail station code
- Willard Grant Conspiracy, an American band
- William Gershom Collingwood, artist
- World Gliding Championships
- World Gold Council, a non-profit association of the world's leading gold mining companies
- World Golf Championships
- Writers Guild of Canada
- Warangal Airport, the IATA Airport code
- Weak gravity conjecture, a hypothesis in theoretical physics
