= YITP =

YITP can stand for:

- Yukawa Institute for Theoretical Physics
- C. N. Yang Institute for Theoretical Physics
