= Gopakumar–Vafa duality =

Duality in string theory

Gopakumar–Vafa duality is a duality in string theory, hence a correspondence between two different theories, in this case between Chern–Simons theory and Gromov–Witten theory. The latter is known as the mathematical equivalent of string theory in mathematics and counts pseudoholomorphic curves on a symplectic manifold, similar to Gopakumar–Vafa invariants and Pandharipande–Thomas invariants. Gopakumar–Vafa duality is named after Rajesh Gopakumar and Cumrun Vafa, who first described it in 1998.

== Formulation ==
Gopakumar–Vafa duality describes a correspondence between Chern–Simons theory on the cotangent bundle $T^*S^3$ over the three-dimensional sphere $S^3$ and Gromov–Witten theory on the Whitney sum $\mathcal{O}(-2) =\mathcal{O}(-1)\oplus\mathcal{O}(-1)$ of the tautological bundle over the two-dimensional sphere $S^2\cong\mathbb{C}P^1$. One has a canonical inclusion $S^3\hookrightarrow\mathbb{R}^4$, which induces an inclusion $T^*S^3\hookrightarrow T^*\mathbb{R}^4\cong\mathbb{R}^4\times\mathbb{R}^4\cong\mathbb{C}^4\cong\operatorname{Mat}_2(\mathbb{C})$. With a suitable endomorphism $\mathbb{C}^4\rightarrow\mathbb{C}^4$ in between, it reduces to a diffeomorphism $T^*S^3\rightarrow\operatorname{SL}_2(\mathbb{C})$ to the special linear group and through composition with the zero section $0\colon S^3\rightarrow T^*S^3$further to a diffeomorphism $S^3\rightarrow\operatorname{SU}(2)$ to the special unitary group. One also has:

$$\mathcal{O}(-1)
=\left\{([z_1:z_2],(w_1,w_2))\in\mathbb{C}P^1\times\mathbb{C}^2|\det\begin{pmatrix}
w_1 & w_2 \\
z_1 & z_2
\end{pmatrix}=0\right\},$$

with $-1$ denoting the first Chern class of the complex line bundle. By descreasing the determinant to vanish completely, $T^*S^3\cong\operatorname{SL}_2(\mathbb{C})$ can be shrunken down to a conifold, which can be obtained as a resolution from $\mathcal{O}(-2) =\mathcal{O}(-1)\oplus\mathcal{O}(-1)$. From the perspective of surgery theory, this corresponds to the surgery $S^3\times\mathbb{R}^3\rightsquigarrow S^2\times\mathbb{R}^4$.

A obvious generalization of the sphere $S^3$ is additionally considering the cyclic group $\mathbb{Z}_p$ to act on it, which leads to Lens spaces $L(p,q)$. Gopakumar–Vafa duality can only be carried over to the Lens space $L(p,1)$.

== Literature ==
- Gopakumar, Rajesh; Vafa, Cumrun (1998-02-03). "Topological Gravity as Large N Topological Gauge Theory". Advances in Theoretical and Mathematical Physics. 2: 413–442. arXiv:hep-th/9802016.
- Gopakumar, Rajesh; Vafa, Cumrun (1998-11-13). "On the Gauge Theory/Geometry Correspondence". Advances in Theoretical and Mathematical Physics. 3: 1415–1443. arXiv:hep-th/9811131.
- Auckly, Dave; Koshkin, Sergiy (2007-01-20). "Introduction to the Gopakumar-Vafa Large N Duality". Geometry & Topology Monographs. 8: 195–456. arXiv:math/0701568.
- Brini, Andrea; Griguolo, Luca; Seminara, Domenico; Tanzini, Alessandro (2008-09-09). "Chern-Simons theory on L(p,q) lens spaces and Gopakumar-Vafa duality". Journal of Geometry and Physics. 60: 417–429. arXiv:0809.1610.
