= Purley High School for Boys =

Purley Boys' High School

Location
- Placehouse Lane; Coulsdon, Greater London, CR5 1YA; England; 51°18′20″N 0°07′15″W

Information
- Motto: Fas et Patria
- Established: 1914
- Closed: 1988
- Local authority: London Borough of Croydon
- Department for Education URN: 126815 Tables
- Ofsted: Reports
- Gender: Boys
- Age: 14 to 18

Purley High School for Boys existed from 1914 to 1988. Originally located in Purley on Godstone Road from 1914, the school moved to a new building on Placehouse Lane, Old Coulsdon, London Borough of Croydon in April 1933.

Originally called Purley County Secondary School for Boys, on opening the school charged £2 10 shillings a term for boys under 12 and £3 a term for older boys. Some free places were provided by the County Council which could be won through an entrance examination. When the school first opened it employed four staff on the academic roll: Headmaster, R.B. Wight. Teachers, B.J. Dorsett, J. Milner, F.C. Serjeant. The surnames of those staff members subsequently became the names used for the first four school houses.

Following the Education Act 1944, the school was renamed, Purley Grammar School for Boys. In 1973, following the abolition of the Grammar School system and the implementation of the Comprehensive System, it was renamed to Purley High School for Boys.

As Purley High School for Boys it was a senior secondary school, for students aged 14 to 18.

For a short period Purley County Secondary School for Girls was co-located with the boys institution. This lasted only from when the girls' school opened in 1933 until the boys' school moved to Old Coulsdon. The girls' school moved to new accommodation in a Stoneyfield Road, Old Coulsdon in 1939.

Purley High School for Boys had a reputation for strictness and for the frequent use of corporal punishment; In 1977–1978 records showed 394 canings in a school of 900 boys. Its record on canings came to the attention of STOPP during the 1970s and 1980s. This was because STOPP happened to be based in Croydon at the time, and managed to get the Local Education Authority to publish an analysis of statistics collated from school punishment books, the first time this had happened in the UK. This resulted in Purley High School for Boys being mentioned in numerous articles in the national press regarding what was criticised as its excessive corporal punishment record. However, statistics for the use of corporal punishment later appeared from other areas of England and Wales, suggesting that Purley's caning record, compared with some other boys' secondary schools, was not quite as extraordinary as STOPP had originally claimed, once the fact that Purley was a 14–18 school (and therefore had about twice the proportion of 14- to 16-year-olds as an 11–18 school) was taken into account, 14–16 being almost invariably the peak age group for getting into trouble at school.

The school motto was Fas et Patria, meaning Faith and Country. The Headmaster from 1968 to 1988 was Derek Akers.

After 52 years at the Placehouse Lane location, the school was closed in 1988, being replaced by Purley Sixth Form College, which was renamed Coulsdon College and then Coulsdon Sixth Form College.

The 1930s Placehouse Lane school buildings were completely demolished during 2010–2011 and have been replaced by new college facilities.

== Notable alumni ==
- Adam Booth, boxing coach
- Simon Jordan, businessman, former chairman of Crystal Palace football club

=== Purley County Secondary / Grammar School ===
- Peter Cushing, actor, horror movies
- Prof Gary Gibbons, Professor of Theoretical Physics since 1997 at the University of Cambridge

== See also ==
- Coulsdon Sixth Form College, which now occupies the school site.
