= Walter Burke Institute for Theoretical Physics =

Research center of California Institute of Technology

- Established: 2014
- Field of research: Theoretical Physics
- Director: Hirosi Ooguri
- Faculty: Sean Carroll; Alexei Kitaev; John Preskill; John Schwarz; Barry Simon; Mark Wise
- Location: Pasadena, California, United States
- Operating agency: California Institute of Technology
- Nobel laureates: David Politzer; Kip Thorne

The Walter Burke Institute for Theoretical Physics is a research center at the California Institute of Technology focused on high-energy physics, condensed matter physics, astrophysics, general relativity, and cosmology. It was founded in 2014.

== History ==
The Institute was founded in 2014 with grants from the Sherman Fairchild Foundation, the Gordon and Betty Moore Foundation, and funding from the California Institute of Technology itself. It had an initial endowment of over $70 million, a significant amount, particularly when placed in the context of Department of Energy funding for high-energy physics. It is named after Walter Burke, a trustee of Caltech and president of the Sherman Fairchild Foundation. Its inaugural director is Hirosi Ooguri, a string theorist.

== See also ==
- Institute for Theoretical Physics (disambiguation)
- Center for Theoretical Physics (disambiguation)
