= Ooguri–Vafa metric =

In differential geometry, the Ooguri–Vafa metric is a four-dimensional Hyperkähler metric. The Ooguri–Vafa metric is named after Hirosi Ooguri and Cumrun Vafa, who first described it in 1996 using the Gibbons–Hawking ansatz. Another construction was given by Davide Gaiotto, Gregory Moore and Andrew Neitzke in 2008.

== Definition ==
The Ooguri–Vafa metric is defined on the four-dimensional total spaces of principal U(1)-bundles over open subsets of the three-dimensional euclidean space $\mathbb{R}^3$. In particular the whole space results in $\mathbb{R}^3\times S^1$.

Define the elliptical fibers $\tau(z)=\frac{1}{2\pi i}\log(z)$ with $\tau_1=\operatorname{Re}(\tau(z))$ and $\tau_2=\operatorname{Im}(\tau(z))$ and let $\lambda$ be the string coupling constant. Further define the scaled spatial coordinate

$\mathbf{y}=\left(x,\frac{z}{\lambda},\frac{\bar{z}}{\lambda}\right)$.

The metric of Ooguri and Vafa has the form

$$ds^2=\lambda^2[V^{-1}(dt-\mathbf{A}\cdot d\mathbf{y})^2+V d\mathbf{y}^2]$$

where $\mathbf{A}=(A_x,A_z,A_{\bar{z}})$ and

$$A_x=-\tau_1=\frac{i}{4\pi}\log\left(\frac{z}{\bar{z}}\right),\quad A_z=0,\quad A_{\bar{z}}=0$$

and $V$ is a potential which gets modified from the form $V=\tau_2=\frac{1}{4\pi}\log\left(\frac{1}{z\bar{z}}\right)$.

=== Requirements for the potential ===
There are 5 requirements for the potential $V$:

- $V$ should be a function of only $x$ and $|z|$, i.e. $V(x,|z|)$ for $|z|=\sqrt{z\bar{z}}$.
- For the metric to be a hyperkähler metric, the following conditions must be met:

$$V^{-1}\Delta V = 0,\quad\text{and}\quad \nabla V = \nabla \times \mathbf{A}$$
where the differential operator $\Delta$ is defined as follows:
$$\Delta :=\partial_x^2+4\lambda^2\partial_z\bar{\partial}_{\bar{z}}.$$

- If $|z|\to \infty$ then one obtains the classical potential defined above:

$$V(x,|z|)\to \frac{1}{4\pi}\log\left(\frac{1}{z\bar{z}}\right)$$

- The metric should be periodic, but not translation-invariant, in the $x$-direction with period $1$, i.e. $V(x,|z|)=V(x+1,|z|)$.
- The singularities of $V$ can be removed by a suitable coordinate transformation.

There exists a unique solution which satisfies all these conditions

$$V(x,|z|)=\frac{1}{4\pi}\sum\limits_{n=-\infty}^{\infty}\left(\frac{1}{\sqrt{(x-n)^2+z\bar{z}/\lambda^2}}-\frac{1}{|n|}\right)+C$$

for a constant $C$. Using Poisson's formula on gets

$$V(x,|z|)=\frac{1}{4\pi}\log\left(\frac{\mu^2}{z\bar{z}}\right)+\sum\limits_{m\neq 0}\frac{1}{2\pi}e^{2\pi i mx}K_0\left(2\pi\frac{|mz|}{\lambda}\right)$$

where $\mu$ is a constant and $K_0$ is the modified Bessel function.

== Literature ==
- Ooguri, Hirosi; Vafa, Cumrun (1996-08-12). "Summing up D-Instantons". Physical Review Letters. 77 (16): 3296–3298. arXiv:hep-th/9608079. doi:10.1103/PhysRevLett.77.3296. PMID 10062185.
- Gaiotto, Davide; Moore, Gregory W.; Neitzke, Andrew (2008-07-29). "Four-dimensional wall-crossing via three-dimensional field theory". Communications in Mathematical Physics. 299: 163–224. arXiv:0807.4723. doi:10.1007/s00220-010-1071-2.
- Chan, Kwokwai (2009-09-19). "The Ooguri-Vafa metric, holomorphic discs and wall-crossing". Mathematical Research Letters. 17 (3): 401–414. arXiv:0909.3608. doi:10.4310/MRL.2010.v17.n3.a3.
- Foscolo, Lorenzo. "Notes on the Ooguri-Vafa metric" (PDF).
