= Rouse Ball Professor of Mathematics =

The Rouse Ball Professorship of Mathematics is one of the senior chairs in the Mathematics Departments at the University of Cambridge and the University of Oxford. The two positions were founded in 1927 by a bequest from the mathematician W. W. Rouse Ball. At Cambridge, this bequest was made with the "hope (but not making it in any way a condition) that it might be found practicable for such professor or reader to include in his or her lectures and treatment historical and philosophical aspects of the subject."

== List of Rouse Ball Professors at Cambridge ==
- 1928–1950 John Edensor Littlewood
- 1950–1958 Abram Samoilovitch Besicovitch
- 1958–1969 Harold Davenport
- 1971–1993 John G. Thompson
- 1994–1997 Nigel Hitchin
- 1998–2020 William Timothy Gowers
- 2023– Wendelin Werner

== List of Rouse Ball Professors at Oxford ==
The chair at Oxford was established with a £25,000 bequest and was initially advertised by the University as a Chair in Mathematical Physics. The Rouse Ball Professor is now hosted at the university's Mathematical Institute, and holds a Fellowship at Wadham College.

- 1928–1950 E. A. Milne
- 1952–1972 Charles Coulson
- 1973–1999 Roger Penrose, Emeritus Rouse Ball Professor of Mathematics
- 1999–2020 Philip Candelas, Emeritus Rouse Ball Professor of Mathematics
- 2020– Luis Fernando Alday, currently Rouse Ball Professor of Mathematics

== See also ==
- Rouse Ball Professor of English Law
