= Gary Gibbons =

British theoretical physicist

Gary Gibbons FRS
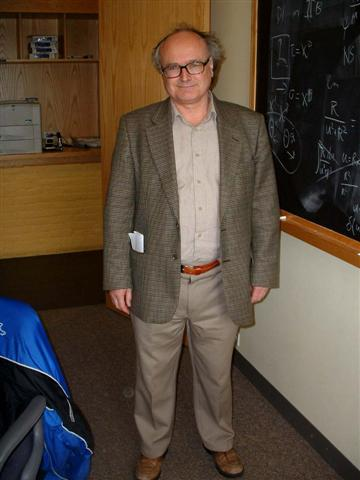
- Gary Gibbons at Harvard University, c. 2005
- Born: Gary William Gibbons; 1 July 1946 (age 80); Coulsdon, London, England
- Education: Purley County Grammar School; University of Cambridge (BA, PhD)
- Known for: Gibbons–Hawking ansatz; Gibbons–Hawking space; Gibbons–Hawking effect; Gibbons–Hawking–York boundary term
- Awards: PhD (1973); FRS (1999); Dirac Medal (ICTP) (2025)
- Scientific career
- Fields: Theoretical physics; Euclidean quantum gravity
- Workplaces: University of Cambridge; Trinity College, Cambridge; Max Planck Institute for Physics
- Thesis: Some aspects of gravitational radiation and gravitational collapse (1973)
- Doctoral advisor: Dennis Sciama; Stephen Hawking
- Doctoral students: Chris Hull
- Website: damtp.cam.ac.uk/people/g.w.gibbons

Gary William Gibbons (born 1 July 1946) is a British theoretical physicist.

== Education ==
Gibbons was born in Coulsdon, Surrey. He was educated at Purley County Grammar School and the University of Cambridge, where in 1969 he became a research student under the supervision of Dennis Sciama. When Sciama moved to the University of Oxford, he became a student of Stephen Hawking, obtaining his PhD from Cambridge in 1973.

== Career and research ==
Apart from a stay at the Max Planck Institute in Munich in the 1970s he has remained in Cambridge throughout his career, becoming a full professor in 1997, a Fellow of the Royal Society in 1999, and a Fellow of Trinity College, Cambridge in 2002.

Having worked on classical general relativity for his PhD thesis, Gibbons focused on the quantum theory of black holes afterwards. Together with Malcolm Perry, he used thermal Green's functions to prove the universality of thermodynamic properties of horizons, including cosmological event horizons. He developed the Euclidean approach to quantum gravity with Stephen Hawking, which allows a derivation of the thermodynamics of black holes from a functional integral approach. As the Euclidean action for gravity is not positive definite, the integral only converges when a particular contour is used for conformal factors.

His work in more recent years includes contributions to research on supergravity, p-branes and M-theory, mainly motivated by string theory. Gibbons remains interested in geometrical problems of all sorts which have applications to physics.

=== Awards and honours ===
Gibbons was elected a Fellow of the Royal Society (FRS) in 1999. His nomination reads

Distinguished for his contributions to General Relativity and the Quantum Theory of Gravity. He played a leading role in the development of the Euclidean approach to quantum gravity and showed how it could be used to understand the thermal character of black holes and inflating universes. This revealed a deep and unexpected relationship between gravitation and thermodynamics. As part of the Euclidean quantum gravity programme, he discovered many of the known gravitational instantons and classified their properties. In the more conventional Lorentzian approach to gravity, he has studied the behaviour of solitons in gauge theories and General Relativity and has shown how supersymmetry leads to Bogomolny inequalities on the masses and charges. More recently he has been investigating the role of topology in gravity and has obtained important restrictions on how the topology of spacetime can change. He is recognised world wide as a leader in the field.

In 2025, he was awarded the Dirac Medal (ICTP).
