= Matthias Gaberdiel =

German theoretical physicist (born 1966)

Matthias Gaberdiel (born June 25, 1966, in Offenburg, Germany) is a theoretical physicist and full professor at ETH Zurich. He is known for his work on higher-spin theory and conformal field theory.

== Research ==
Gaberdiel works on string theory and conformal field theory. Recently, he has mainly worked on the duality between higher spin theories on AdS and dual conformal field theories (with Rajesh Gopakumar).

His most cited publications are:

- Gaberdiel MR, Gopakumar R. An AdS 3 dual for minimal model CFTs. Physical Review D. 2011 Mar 8;83(6):066007. According to Google Scholar, it has been cited 466 times.
- Gaberdiel, Matthias R., and Horst G. Kausch. "A rational logarithmic conformal field theory." arXiv preprint hep-th/9606050 (1996). According to Google Scholar, it has been cited 268 times.
- Bergman O, Gaberdiel MR. Stable non-BPS D-particles. Physics Letters B. 1998 Nov 26;441(1-4):133-40. According to Google Scholar, it has been cited 189 times.
- Gaberdiel MR. An algebraic approach to logarithmic conformal field theory. International Journal of Modern Physics A. 2003 Oct 10;18(25):4593-638. According to Google Scholar, it has been cited 232 times.
