= Andrew J. Hanson =

American theoretical physicist and computer scientist

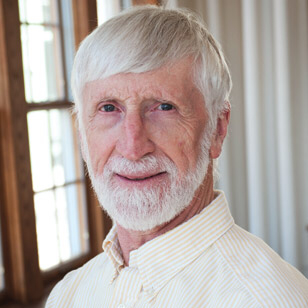
- Born: February 22, 1944 (age 82)
- Education: •Harvard College •MIT
- Known for: Eguchi-Hanson space
- Awards: 2nd place in Gravity Research Foundation contest in 1979
- Scientific career
- Fields: •Physics •Computer Science
- Workplaces: •Postdoctoral: Institute for Advanced Study, Cornell, SLAC National Accelerator Laboratory, and Lawrence Berkeley National Laboratory •SRI International •Indiana University
- Doctoral advisor: Kerson Huang
- Website: Andrew J. Hanson's Home Page

Andrew J. Hanson (born February 22, 1944) is an American theoretical physicist and computer scientist. Hanson is best known in theoretical physics as the co-discoverer of the Eguchi–Hanson metric, the first gravitational instanton. This Einstein metric is asymptotically locally Euclidean and self-dual, closely parallel to the Yang-Mills instanton. He is also known as the co-author of Constrained Hamiltonian Systems and of Gravitation, Gauge Theories, and Differential Geometry, which attempted to bridge the gap between theoretical physicists and mathematicians at a time when concepts relevant to the two disciplines were rapidly unifying. His subsequent work in computer science focused on computer graphics and visualization of exotic mathematical objects, including widely used images of the Calabi-Yau quintic cross-sections used to represent the hidden dimensions of 10-dimensional string theory. He is the author of Visualizing Quaternions and Visualizing More Quaternions.

== Early life and education ==
Hanson was born at Los Alamos where his father, son of Norwegian immigrant homesteaders, spent his first postdoctoral years as a nuclear physicist working on the Manhattan Project. His mother was a self-taught ecologically oriented historian of Central Illinois. His maternal grandfather was Dean of Agriculture at the University of Missouri, and all three of his maternal uncles were professors of physics.

Hanson and his family survived the shipwreck of the Andrea Doria in 1956. His family was on their way back to the United States from his father's sabbatical year in Torino, Italy, working with Gleb Wataghin on the post-war recovery of the Italian nuclear physics program.

As a high-school student in Urbana, IL, he wrote the core real-time multi-user CDC 1604 operating system used for the PLATO automated teaching project. He received a B.S. in chemistry and physics from Harvard College in 1966 and a Ph.D. degree in theoretical physics from the Massachusetts Institute of Technology in 1971 under Kerson Huang. Sergio Fubini and Roman Jackiw were also influential mentors of his at MIT.

== Career ==
As Hanson completed his doctoral work, Fubini introduced him to Tullio Regge, with whom he was a postdoc at the Institute for Advanced Study in Princeton from 1971 to 1973. (Both Fubini and Regge had by coincidence studied physics at Torino with Wataghin shortly before the Hanson family came to Torino.) He spent the 1973–1974 academic year at Cornell and then was at SLAC from 1974 to 1976 and LBL from 1976 to 1978. He worked briefly at the Exploratorium for Frank Oppenheimer, was employed in the Silicon Valley software industry, and then joined the machine vision group of the SRI International Artificial Intelligence Center in 1980. In 1989, he moved to Indiana University Bloomington, where he served as Computer Science Department Chair from 2004 to 2009, retiring in 2012, and continues as an Emeritus faculty member.

Hanson's physics research ranges from early aspects of string theory to field theory and general relativity. In 1978, he and Tohru Eguchi derived the Eguchi-Hanson metric, the first gravitational instanton, the class of Einstein solutions bearing the closest known resemblance to the BPST Yang-Mills instanton discovered in 1975. He and Eguchi shared second prize in the 1979 Gravity Research Foundation competition. During his decade at the SRI International Artificial Intelligence Center, he worked on the DARPA Image Understanding Testbed and related machine vision projects. At Indiana University, he turned to research in computer graphics and scientific visualization. Hanson's work there focused on virtual reality, the fourth dimension, and quaternion maps of orientation spaces, leading to the monograph Visualizing Quaternions published in 2006 and finally to Visualizing More Quaternions published in 2024. Recent work has dealt with quantum computing, quaternion methods for proteomics analysis, and computer graphics representations of Calabi-Yau spaces related to the hidden dimensions of string theory. His interactive graphics approach to understanding the fourth dimension is reflected in the iPhone Apps 4Dice and 4DRoom.

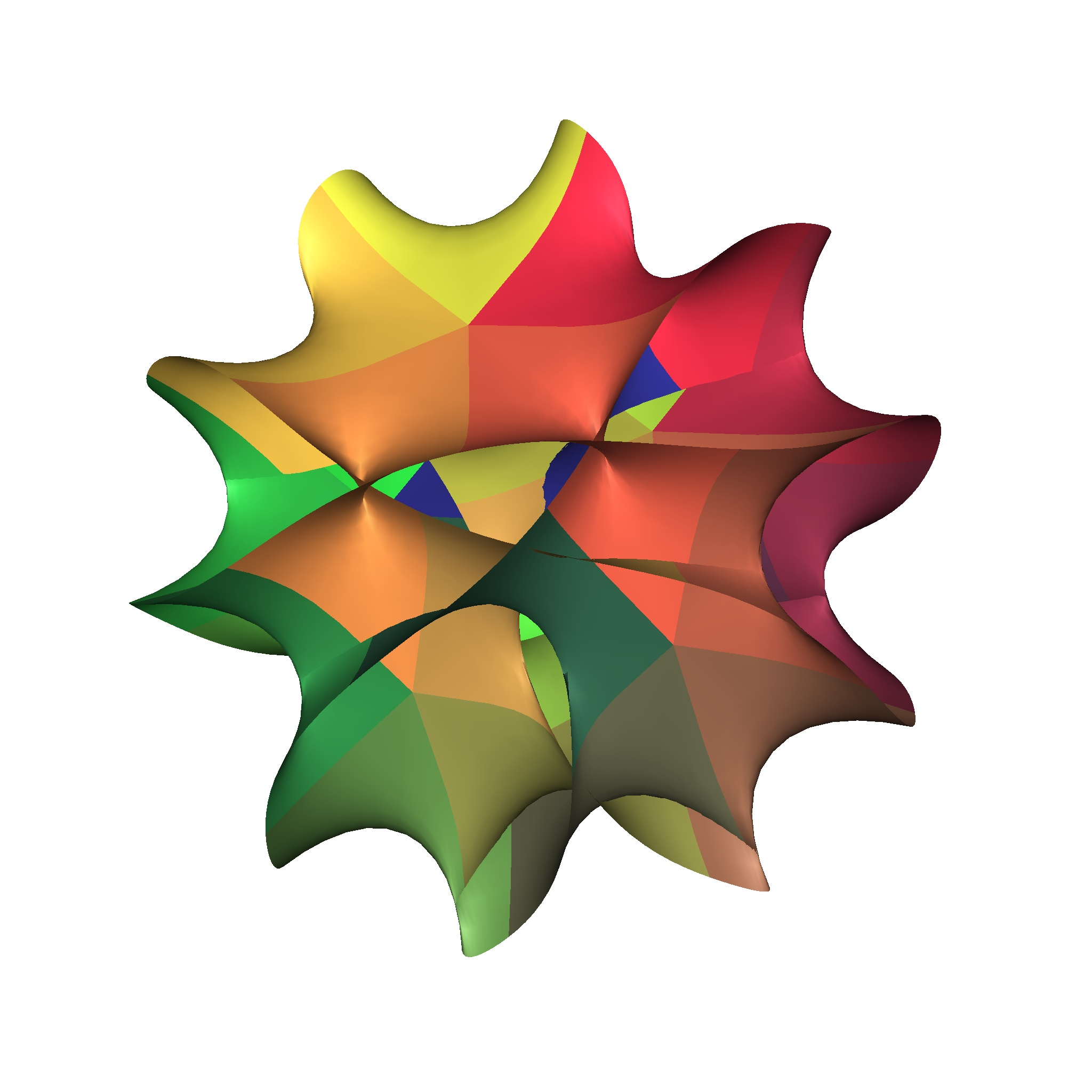
A 2D slice of a 6D Calabi-Yau quintic manifold.

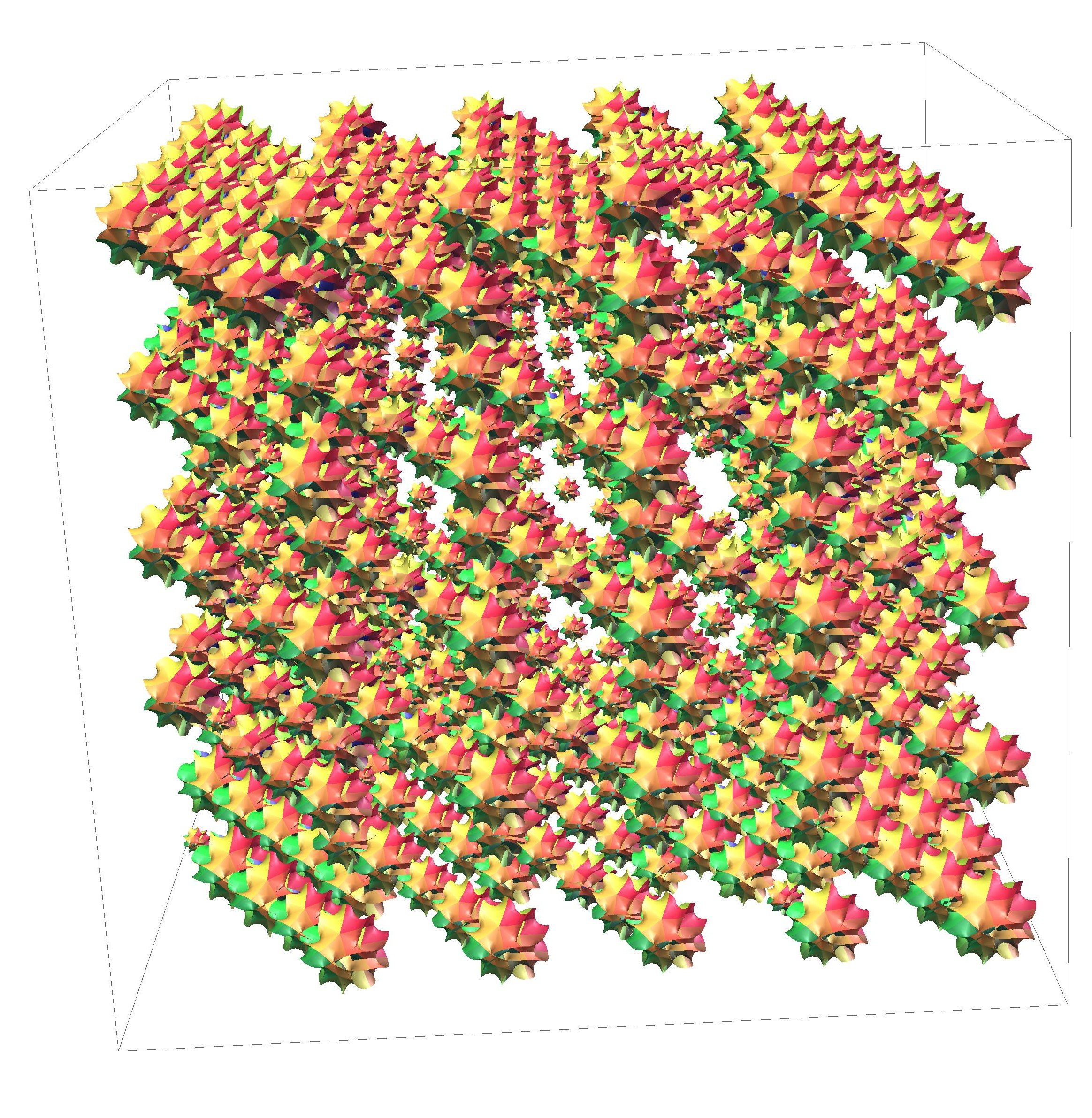
Calabi-Yau 6D quintic represented as a sampled lattice.
