= Gopakumar–Vafa invariant =

Topological invariants concerning BPS states

In theoretical physics, Rajesh Gopakumar and Cumrun Vafa introduced in a series of papers numerical invariants of Calabi-Yau threefolds, later referred to as the Gopakumar–Vafa invariants. These physically defined invariants represent the number of BPS states on a Calabi–Yau threefold. In the same papers, the authors also derived the following formula which relates the Gromov–Witten invariants and the Gopakumar-Vafa invariants.

$$\sum_{g=0}^\infty~\sum_{\beta\in H_2(M,\mathbb{Z})} \text{GW}(g,\beta)q^{\beta}\lambda^{2g-2}=\sum_{g=0}^\infty~\sum_{k=1}^\infty~\sum_{\beta\in H_2(M,\mathbb{Z})}\text{GV}(g,\beta)\frac{1}{k}\left(2\sin\left(\frac{k\lambda}{2}\right)\right)^{2g-2}q^{k\beta}$$,

where

- $\beta$ is the class of holomorphic curves with genus g,
- $\lambda$ is the topological string coupling, mathematically a formal variable,
- $q^\beta=\exp(2\pi i t_\beta)$ with $t_\beta$ the Kähler parameter of the curve class $\beta$,
- $\text{GW}(g,\beta)$ are the Gromov–Witten invariants of curve class $\beta$ at genus $g$,
- $\text{GV}(g,\beta)$ are the Gopakumar–Vafa invariants of curve class $\beta$ at genus $g$.

Notably, Gromov-Witten invariants are generally rational numbers while Gopakumar-Vafa invariants are always integers.

== As a partition function in topological quantum field theory ==
Gopakumar–Vafa invariants can be viewed as a partition function in topological quantum field theory. They are proposed to be the partition function in Gopakumar–Vafa form:

$$Z_{top}=\exp\left[\sum_{g=0}^\infty~\sum_{k=1}^\infty~\sum_{\beta\in H_2(M,\mathbb{Z})}\text{GV}(g,\beta)\frac{1}{k}\left(2\sin\left(\frac{k\lambda}{2}\right)\right)^{2g-2}q^{k\beta}\right]\ .$$

== Mathematical approaches ==
While Gromov-Witten invariants have rigorous mathematical definitions (both in symplectic and algebraic geometry), there is no mathematically rigorous definition of the Gopakumar-Vafa invariants, except for very special cases.

On the other hand, Gopakumar-Vafa's formula implies that Gromov-Witten invariants and Gopakumar-Vafa invariants determine each other. One can solve Gopakumar-Vafa invariants from Gromov-Witten invariants, while the solutions are a priori rational numbers. Ionel-Parker proved that these expressions are indeed integers.

== See also ==
- Gopakumar–Vafa duality
