= Greg Moore (physicist) =

American theoretical physicist

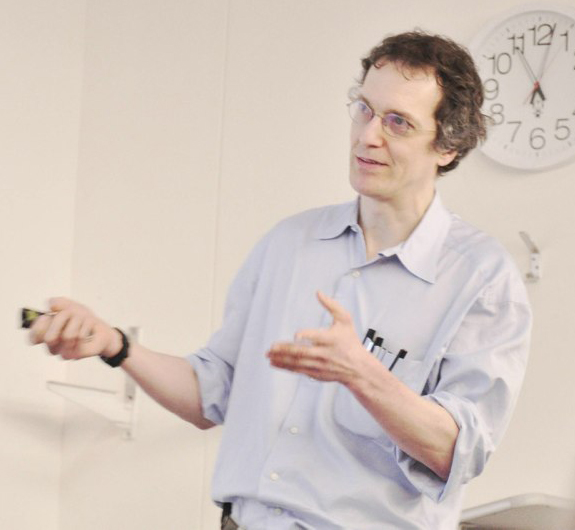
Gregory Moore, 2012

Gregory W. Moore is an American theoretical physicist who specializes in mathematical physics and string theory. Moore is a professor in the Physics and Astronomy Department of Rutgers University and a member of the university's High Energy Theory group.

== Education ==
Moore received an AB in physics from Princeton University in 1982 and a PhD in the same subject from Harvard University in 1985.

== Career ==
Moore's research has focused on: D-branes on Calabi–Yau manifolds and BPS state counting; relations to Borcherds products, automorphic forms, black-hole entropy, and wall-crossing; applications of the theory of automorphic forms to conformal field theory, string compactification, black hole entropy counting, and the AdS/CFT correspondence; potential relation between string theory and number theory; effective low energy supergravity theories in string compactification and the computation of nonperturbative stringy effects in effective supergravities; topological field theories, and applications to invariants of manifolds; string cosmology and string field theory.

Moore was a member of the advisory board for Springer's Encyclopedia of Mathematical Physics.

In 2008, he as well as Davide Gaiotto and Andrew Neitzke gave an alternative construction of the Ooguri–Vafa metric, which was first constructed with the Gibbons–Hawking ansatz.

== Awards ==
Moore won a 2007 Essays on Gravitation Award from the Gravity Research Foundation for his essay, joint with Frederik Denef, How Many Black Holes Fit on the Head of a Pin? In 2012 he became a fellow of the American Mathematical Society.

Moore won the 2014 Dannie Heineman Prize for Mathematical Physics "For eminent contributions to mathematical physics with a wide influence in many fields, ranging from string theory to supersymmetric gauge theory, conformal field theory, condensed matter physics and four-manifold theory." In 2015, he was jointly awarded the 2015 Dirac Medal by ICTP.

Moore was elected as a member of the American Academy of Arts and Sciences in 2011 and a member of the National Academy of Sciences in 2020.

== Personal life ==
Moore is married to Karin M. Rabe, and son of Arthur Cotton Moore.
