= Chris Hull =

British professor of theoretical physics (born 1957)

Chris Hull FRS FInstP
- Born: Christopher Michael Hull; 1957 (age 68–69)
- Education: Haberdashers' Aske's Boys' School
- Alma mater: University of Cambridge (BA, PhD)
- Awards: Dirac Medal (IOP) (2003); Royal Society Wolfson Research Merit Award (2002)
- Scientific career
- Fields: Theoretical physics
- Institutions: Imperial College London
- Thesis: The structure and stability of the vacua of supergravity (1983)
- Doctoral advisor: Gary Gibbons
- Website: imperial.ac.uk/people/c.hull

Christopher Michael Hull (born 1957) FRS FInstP is a professor of theoretical physics at Imperial College London. Hull is known for his work on string theory, M-theory, and generalized complex structures. Edward Witten drew partially from Hull's work for his development of M-theory.

== Education ==
Hull was educated at Haberdashers' Aske's Boys' School and the University of Cambridge where he was a student of King's College, Cambridge and awarded a Bachelor of Arts degree in 1979 followed by a PhD in 1983 for research supervised by Gary Gibbons.

== Career and research ==
Hull conducts research into quantum gravity, a field that aims to discover a unifying theory of quantum theory and general relativity. His particular contributions have been made to superstring theory, which models particles and forces as vibrations of 'supersymmetric strings', and supergravity, which combines supersymmetry with general relativity.

Many mathematical challenges facing quantum gravity are being met through Hull's efforts to bring in, and extend, techniques from geometry and field theory. His work laid the foundations of M-theory, which brings together apparently competing theories. Overall success in quantum gravity would revolutionise our understanding of the fundamental nature of matter and the origins of, and evolution, of our Universe.

He leads a major research programme in the Department of Physics at Imperial College London, with investigations that include extended geometries, flux geometries and holographic structures.

=== Awards and honours ===
Hull was awarded a Royal Society Wolfson Research Merit Award in 2002 and the Paul Dirac Medal and Prize by the Institute of Physics in 2003. He was awarded a Science and Engineering Research Council (SERC) Advanced Research fellowship in 1987 and an Engineering and Physical Sciences Research Council (EPSRC) Senior Research Fellowship in 1996. He is also a Fellow of the Institute of Physics (FInstP).
