= Coulsdon Sixth Form College =

Sixth form college in Old Coulsdon, England

Coulsdon College

Location
- Placehouse Lane; Old Coulsdon, Coulsdon, CR5 1YA; England

Information
- Type: Sixth Form College
- Local authority: London Borough of Croydon
- Department for Education URN: 130433 Tables
- Ofsted: Reports
- Head teacher: Emer Lesova
- Gender: Male/Female
- Age: 16 to 19
- Enrolment: around 1100
- Website: http://www.coulsdon.ac.uk/

Coulsdon Sixth Form College is a Sixth Form College for 16 to 19 year-olds based in Old Coulsdon, London and is built on the site of Purley High School for Boys.

== Courses ==
The college offers predominantly GCE A Level and BTEC Level 3 courses, with provision for students to enrol on an Intermediate Programme (pre-A Level) and GCSE re-sit courses in English and Maths. The college has also recently introduced a T Level in Laboratory Science.

Students at Coulsdon Sixth Form College have the option to ‘mix and match’ A Levels with BTEC Level 3 courses, which allows them to customise their study programmes to best match their interests and abilities. The range of courses covers: Visual and Performing Arts, Music, Business, Travel, Sport, Science, IT, Health and Social Care, Mathematics, Humanities, Languages and Media. This programme of study is unique to the college.

== Facilities ==
The college is housed in a three-storey university style building. It has learning facilities such as a Learning Resource Centre (LRC) with 90 computers.

Coulsdon Sixth Form College also offers students other facilities such as a Refectory, a theatre, sport hall, gym, netball and tennis courts and a playfield.

== Activities ==
Students from the college can take part in the College Activities Programme and get involved in extra-curricular clubs and activities. These change each term but usually include a mix of skill-based activities, recreational sports and career orientated clubs. Progression Week in June enables Lower Sixth students to play a role in an action-packed week of activities, including external trips and a variety of college-based experiences, such as visits to theatres, places of historic interest, but also personal fitness sessions, creative workshops and activities to help with career planning.

== Sports ==
In addition to the floodlit Astro Turf football/hockey pitch, tennis courts and extensive playing fields on site, the college has a Sports Centre comprising a sports hall and fitness suite. There is also a Football Academy, run by FTF Academy. This offers students the chance to benefit from football coaching in addition to their main course at College.

== Performing Arts ==
The college has three studios, two dedicated to Music, and a theatre. There are annual shows which showcase a variety of musical and theatrical productions throughout the year enable students to express their performance skills.
