= Cumrun Vafa =

Iranian theoretical physicist

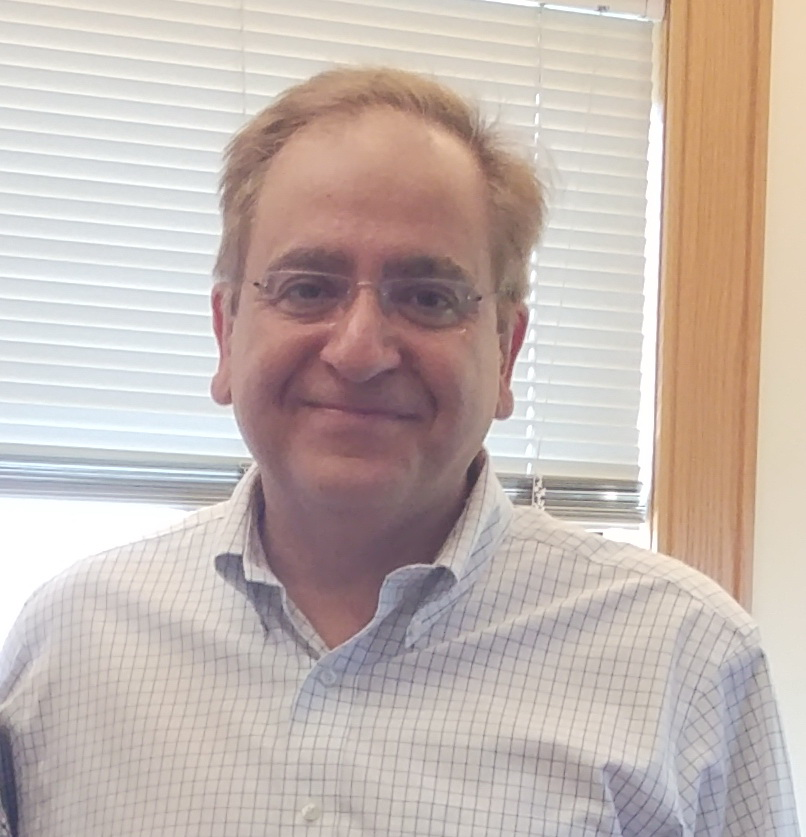
- Born: 1 August 1960 (age 66); Tehran, Iran
- Education: Massachusetts Institute of Technology (BS); Princeton University (PhD)
- Known for: F-theory; Vafa–Witten equations; Vafa–Witten theorem; Gopakumar–Vafa duality; Gopakumar–Vafa invariant; Brandenberger–Vafa mechanism; Ooguri–Vafa metric; Mirror symmetry; Swampland; Weak gravity conjecture
- Children: Keyon Vafa
- Awards: Dirac Medal (2008); Eisenbud Prize (2008); Dannie Heineman Prize for Mathematical Physics (2016); Breakthrough Prize in Fundamental Physics (2017); Mustafa Prize (2021)
- Scientific career
- Fields: Theoretical physics
- Workplaces: Harvard University
- Thesis: Symmetries, inequalities and index theorems (1985)
- Doctoral advisor: Edward Witten
- Doctoral students: Freddy Cachazo; Daniel L. Jafferis; Andrew Neitzke; Eric Zaslow

Cumrun or Kamran Vafa (Persian: کامران وفا, Persian pronunciation: [kɒːmˈrɒːn væˈfɒː]; born 1 August 1960) is an Iranian-American theoretical physicist and the Hollis Professor of Mathematicks and Natural Philosophy at Harvard University. In October 2025, Vafa was appointed the Timken University Professor at Harvard, the highest distinction a faculty member can receive at the university.

== Early life and education ==
Cumrun Vafa was born in Tehran, Iran on 1 August 1960. He became interested in physics as a young child (with such questions as why the moon did not fall from the sky), and developed his interest in math in high school, fascinated by how mathematics could predict the movement of objects.

He graduated from Alborz High School in Tehran and moved to the United States in 1976 to study at university. He received a B.S. in mathematics and physics from the Massachusetts Institute of Technology (MIT) in 1986. He received his Ph.D. in physics from Princeton University in 1988 after completing a doctoral dissertation, titled "Symmetries, inequalities and index theorems", under the supervision of Edward Witten.

== Academia ==
After his PhD degree, Vafa became a junior fellow via the Harvard Society of Fellows at Harvard University, where he later got a junior faculty position. In 1989 he was offered a senior faculty position, and he has been there ever since.

Vafa worked at Princeton University within the Institute for Advanced Study, within the School of Natural Sciences and the School of Mathematics in 1994.

== Research ==
Vafa's research is primarily in string theory, and is focused on the nature of quantum gravity and the relation between geometry and quantum field theories. He is known in the string theory community for his co-discovery with Strominger that the Bekenstein-Hawking entropy of a black hole can be accounted for by solitonic states of superstring theory, and for expounding the relation between geometry and field theories that arise through string dualities (culminating in the Gopakumar–Vafa conjecture). This topic has been known as "geometric engineering of quantum field theories".

In 1997, he developed F-theory, a 12-dimensional theory that compactifies to 10-D Type IIB superstring theory.

He is also interested in understanding the underlying meaning of string dualities, as well as trying to apply superstring theory to some unsolved questions of elementary particle physics such as the hierarchy problem and the cosmological constant problem.

He has made contributions to topological string theories and to the understanding of mirror symmetry.

He is a trustee of Network of Iranians for Knowledge and Innovation (NIKI).

== Awards and honors ==
In 2017, Vafa, alongside Andrew Strominger and Joseph Polchinski, jointly won the Breakthrough Prize in Fundamental Physics for their advancement of string theory and jointly won the 2014 Breakthrough Prize in Physics Frontiers Prize.

He is the recipient of the Abdus Salam International Centre for Theoretical Physics (ICTP)'s, 2008 Dirac Medal, which was won alongside Juan Maldacena, and Joseph Polchinski for their advancement of string theory.

In 1998 he was a Plenary Speaker at the International Congress of Mathematicians.

In 2016, Vafa was awarded the Dannie Heineman Prize for Mathematical Physics.

Vafa was elected as a member of the American Academy of Arts and Sciences in 2005 and as a member of the National Academy of Sciences in 2009.

In 2021, Vafa was awarded the Mustafa Prize.

=== Timken University Professor appointment ===
In October 2025, Vafa was appointed the Timken University Professor at Harvard, the highest distinction a faculty member can receive at the university. The Timken professorship specifically honors distinguished scholars in any field of science.

== Publications ==
=== Research articles ===
Vafa has co-authored and published more than 300 research articles in the fields of string theory, mathematics, and physics, with many other researchers, including Robbert Dijkgraaf, Hirosi Ooguri, Mina Aganagic, Sergei Gukov, Rajesh Gopakumar, Lotte Hollands, and many others. This is a select list of these works:

- Dijkgraaf, Robbert; Vafa, Cumrun (September 2009). "Toda Theories, Matrix Models, Topological Strings, and N=2 Gauge Systems". p. 41. arXiv:0909.2453 [hep-th].
- Dijkgraaf, Robbert; Hollands, Lotte; Sulkowski, Piotr; Vafa, Cumrun (2008). "Supersymmetric Gauge Theories, Intersecting Branes and Free Fermions". Journal of High Energy Physics. 2008 (2): 106. arXiv:0709.4446. Bibcode:2008JHEP...02..106D. doi:10.1088/1126-6708/2008/02/106. S2CID 3827567 – via ResearchGate.
- Dijkgraaf, Robbert; Gopakumar, Rajesh; Ooguri, Hirosi; Vafa, Cumrun (September 2006). "Baby universes and string theory". International Journal of Modern Physics D. 15 (10): 1581–1586. Bibcode:2006IJMPD..15.1581D. doi:10.1142/S0218271806008978. S2CID 199676528 – via ResearchGate.
- Dixon, L; Harvey, JA; Vafa, C; Witten, E. "Strings on orbifolds". Nuclear Physics.
- Hori, Kentaro; Vafa, Cumrun (2000). "Mirror Symmetry". arXiv:hep-th/0002222.

=== Books ===
- Hori, Kentaro; Katz, Sheldon; Klemm, Albrecht; Pandharipande, Rahul; Thomas, Richard; Vafa, Cumrun; Vakil, Ravi; Zaslow, Eric (2003). Mirror Symmetry (Clay Mathematics Monographs, V. 1). American Mathematical Society. ISBN 978-0821829554.
- Vafa, Cumrun; Yau, Shing-Tung (S.T.) (1999). Winter School on Mirror Symmetry, Vector Bundles and Lagrangian Submanifolds. American Mathematical Society. ISBN 978-0821821596.
- Vafa, Cumrun (2020). Puzzles to Unravel the Universe. Independently published. ISBN 979-8642693636.
