= Gibbons–Hawking space =

Manifold in mathematical physics

In mathematical physics, a Gibbons–Hawking space, named after Gary Gibbons and Stephen Hawking, is essentially a hyperkähler manifold with an extra U(1) symmetry. (In general, Gibbons–Hawking metrics are a subclass of hyperkähler metrics.) Gibbons–Hawking spaces, especially ambipolar ones, find an application in the study of black hole microstate geometries.

== See also ==
- Gibbons–Hawking effect
