= Tohru Eguchi =

Japanese theoretical physicist (1948–2019)

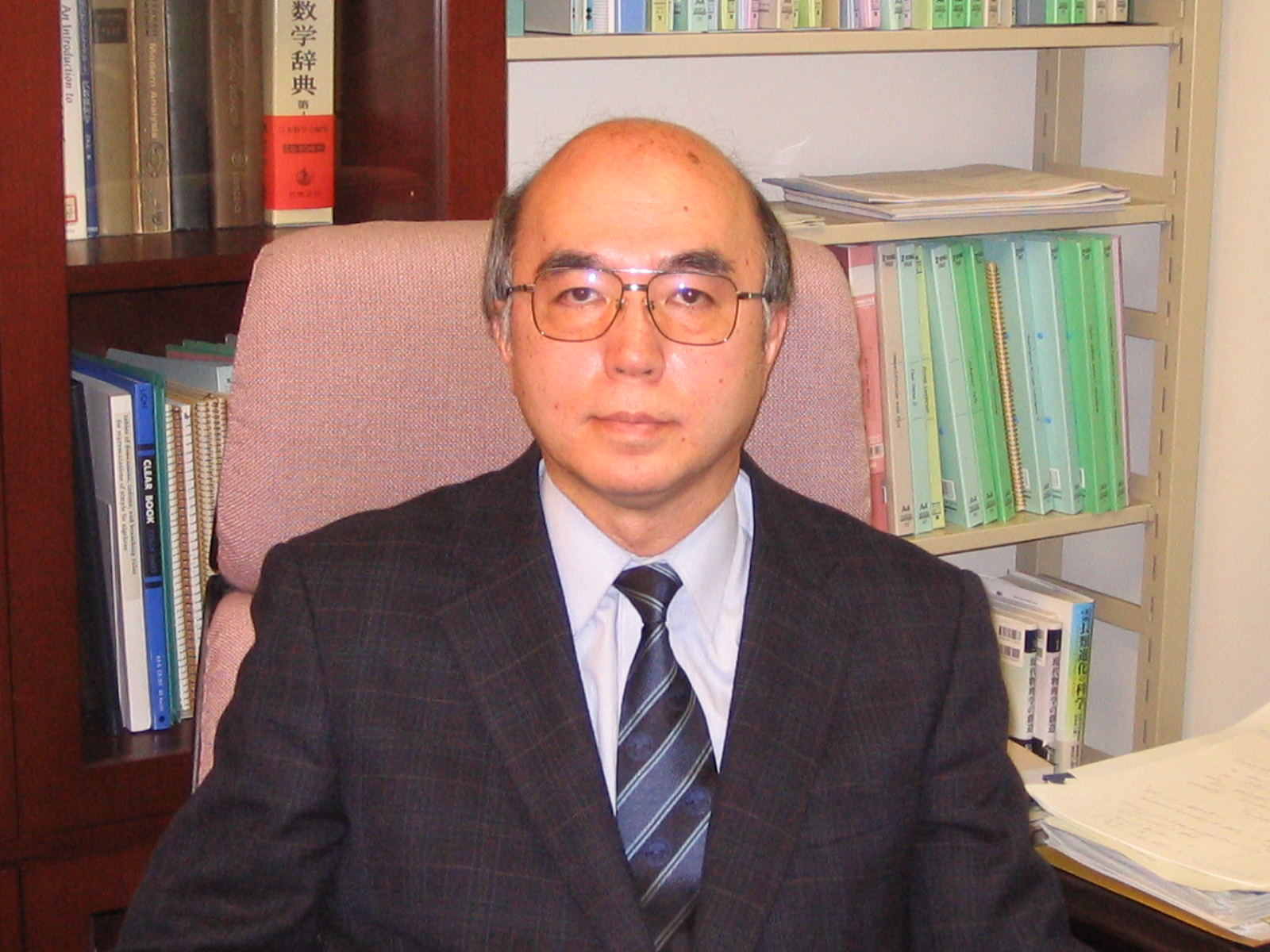
- Born: February 2, 1948
- Died: January 30, 2019 (aged 70)

Tohru Eguchi (江口 徹, February 2, 1948 – January 30, 2019) was a Japanese theoretical physicist.

== Life and career ==
Tohru Eguchi was a professor at the University of Tokyo, and then at the Yukawa Institute for Theoretical Physics at Kyoto University, of which he was acting director in 2009. From 2012, he was a specially-appointed professor at Rikkyo University. He dealt in particular with differential geometric methods in physics, with Superstring theory, Conformal field theory, Topological quantum field theory, Lattice gauge theory, Quantum gravity, and the Theory of Gravitation.

While at SLAC in 1978, Eguchi and Andrew J. Hanson discovered an exact Euclidean instanton solution of the vacuum equations of general relativity, the Eguchi–Hanson space metric. This solution has applications, for example, in the construction of smooth compact Calabi–Yau manifolds in superstring theory.

In the early 1980s, he published an influential and widely cited review article on differential geometric methods in physics with Andrew J. Hanson and Peter Gilkey. They extensively treated the physical applications of the Atiyah-Singer index theorem and related mathematical results.

With Hikaru Kawai, he developed the Eguchi-Kawai model for lattice theories with an SU(N) gauge group in the limit of large N. They showed that in this limit the lattice gauge theory for an infinite lattice and unit cube are identical and that this correspondence can also be maintained in the continuum limit of the lattice. Spacetime is incorporated in this large N limit as though it were an internal degree of freedom.

== Awards ==
- Eguchi shared second prize with Hanson in the 1979 Gravity Research Foundation competition.
- In 1984 he received the Nishina Prize, and in 2009, he received the Imperial Prize and the Prize of the Japanese Academy of Sciences.
