= Hirosi Ooguri =

Japanese physicist (born 1962)

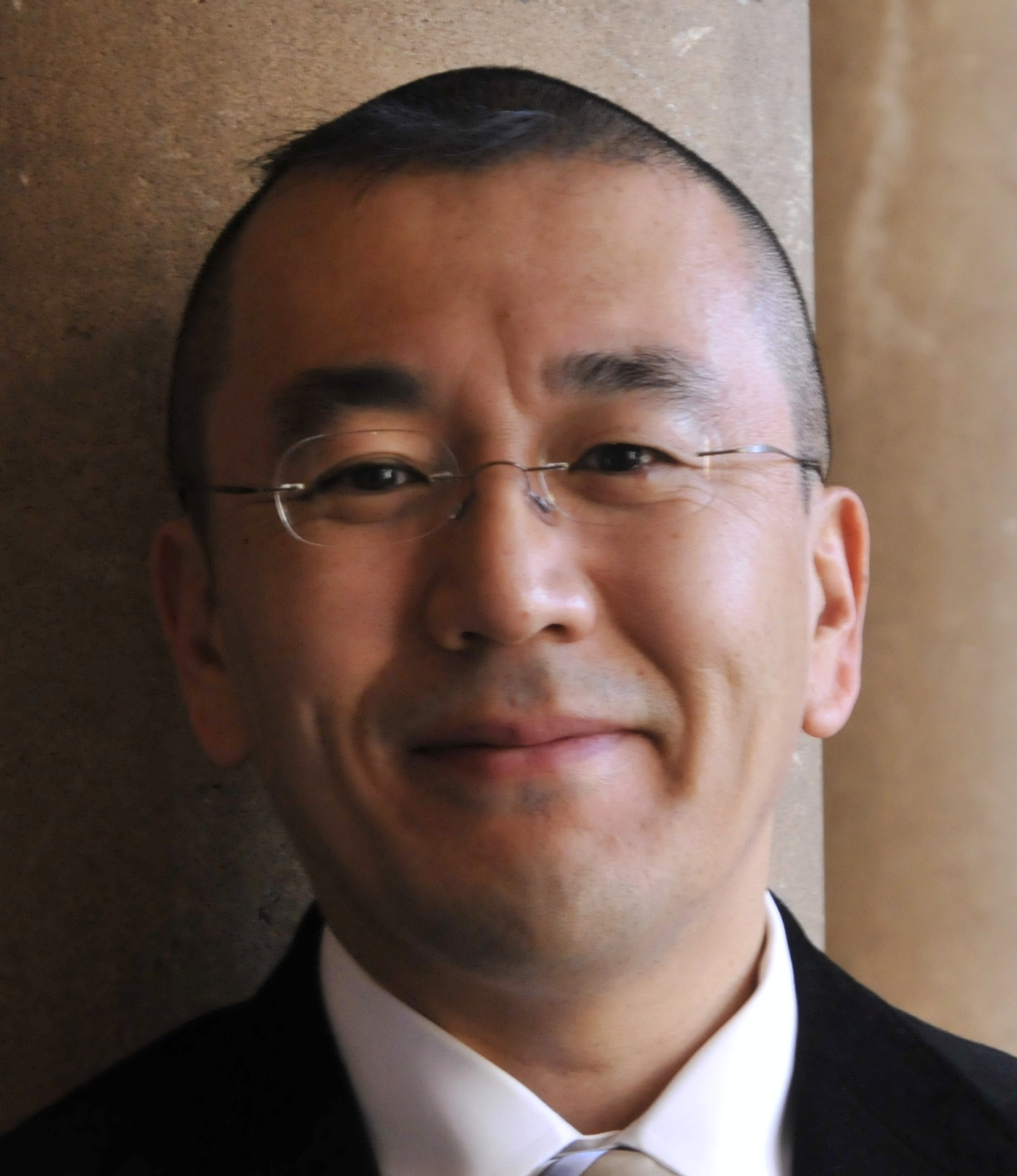
- Born: 1962 (age 63–64); Gifu Prefecture
- Education: Kyoto University
- Known for: Ooguri–Vafa metric
- Awards: Medal of Honor with Purple Ribbon; Leonard Eisenbud Prize for Mathematics and Physics; Fellow of American Academy of Arts and Sciences; Simons Investigator Award; Humboldt Research Award; Hamburg Prize; Nishina Memorial Prize
- Scientific career
- Fields: Theoretical Physics
- Workplaces: California Institute of Technology; University of Tokyo

Hirosi Ooguri (spelled as Hiroshi Oguri in government documents) (大栗 博司; born 1962) is a theoretical physicist working on quantum field theory, quantum gravity, superstring theory, and their interfaces with mathematics. He is Fred Kavli Professor of Theoretical Physics and Mathematics and the Founding Director of the Walter Burke Institute for Theoretical Physics at California Institute of Technology. He is also the director of the Kavli Institute for the Physics and Mathematics at the University of Tokyo and is the chair of the board of trustees of the Aspen Center for Physics in Colorado. In July 2025, he was appointed chair of the Division of Physics, Mathematics and Astronomy (PMA) at Caltech.

Ooguri aims at discovering mathematical structures in these theories and exploiting them to invent new theoretical tools to solve fundamental questions in physics. In particular, he developed the topological string theory to compute Feynman diagrams in superstring theory and used it to study mysterious quantum mechanical properties of black holes. He also made fundamental contributions to conformal field theories in two dimensions, D-branes in Calabi-Yau manifolds, the AdS/CFT correspondence, and properties of supersymmetric gauge theories and their relations to superstring theory.

== Career ==
Completing his bachelor's degree in 1984 and his master's degree in 1986, both at Kyoto University, Ooguri became a tenured faculty member at the University of Tokyo in 1986. He was a member the Institute for Advanced Study in Princeton and was appointed an assistant professor at the University of Chicago before receiving his Ph.D. from the University of Tokyo in 1989. He was an associate professor at Kyoto University in 1990–1994 and returned to the United States as a professor of physics at the University of California at Berkeley in 1994. He moved to California Institute of Technology (Caltech) in 2000, where he is the inaugural holder of the Fred Kavli Chair.

At Caltech, Ooguri served as the deputy chair of the Division of Physics, Mathematics and Astronomy, equivalent of a vice dean of physical sciences. He led the establishment of the Walter Burke Institute for Theoretical Physics and was appointed its founding director in 2014.

Ooguri also helped establish the Kavli Institute for the Physics and Mathematics of the Universe in Japan in 2007. After serving as its principal investigator for 11 years, he became the director in 2018.

Ooguri has been a member of the Aspen Center for Physics since 2003. After serving as the scientific secretary a trustee, and the president, he was elected the chair of the board of trustees of the center in 2021.

Ooguri is a Fellow of the American Academy of Arts and Sciences and an investigator of the Simons Foundation. He has received the Eisenbud Prize from the American Mathematical Society, the Humboldt Research Award and the Hamburg Prize in Germany, and the Nishina Memorial Prize in Japan.

Ooguri's popular science books have sold over a quarter million copies in Japan, and one of them was awarded the Kodansha Prize for Science Books. He also supervised a science movie, which was selected for the Best Educational Production Award from the International Planetarium Society.

== Awards ==
- Leonard Eisenbud Prize for Mathematics and Physics, awarded by the American Mathematical Society (2008). This was the inaugural prize, which he shared with Andrew Strominger and Cumrun Vafa
- Takagi Lecturer, the only named lecture series of the Mathematical Society of Japan (2008)
- Humboldt Research Award from the Alexander von Humboldt Foundation (2009)
- Nishina Memorial Prize from the Nishina Foundation (2009)
- Simons Investigator Award (2012)
- Fellow of the American Mathematical Society, (2012)
- Kodansha Prize for Science books (2013)
- Fellow of the American Academy of Arts and Sciences (since 2016)
- Chunichi Cultural Prize (2016)
- Hamburg Prize for Theoretical Physics (2018)
- Medal of Honor with Purple Ribbon (2019)
- Asian Scientist 100, Asian Scientist, (2019)

== Other activities ==
Ooguri has organized many international conferences and workshops, including Strings `98 in Santa Barbara, Strings 2003 in Kyoto, and Strings 2018 in Okinawa.

Ooguri has been on the editorial boards of Advances in Theoretical and Mathematical Physics, the Journal of High Energy Physics (1997–2006), Nuclear Physics B (1998–2013), Physical Review D (2006–2009) and Communications in Mathematical Physics (2014–2015). He has also served on various boards and advisory committees.
