= Gibbons–Hawking ansatz =

Method in general relativity

In mathematics, the Gibbons–Hawking ansatz is a method of constructing gravitational instantons introduced by Gary Gibbons and Stephen Hawking (1978, 1979). It gives examples of hyperkähler manifolds in dimension 4 that are invariant under a circle action.

== Description ==
Suppose that $U$ is an open subset of $\mathbb{R}^3$, and let $*$ denote the Hodge star operator on $\mathbb{R}^3$ with respect to the usual (flat) Euclidean metric. $V$ is a harmonic function defined on $U$ such that the cohomology class $\left[\frac{1}{2\pi}*dV\right]$ is integral, i.e. lies in the image of $H^2(U;\mathbb{Z}) \hookrightarrow H^2(U;\mathbb{R})$. Then there is a $U(1)$-principal bundle $\pi : P \to U$ equipped with a connection 1-form $\eta \in \Omega^1(P;\mathfrak{u}(1))$ whose curvature form is $d\eta = \pi^*(*dV)$. Then the Riemannian metric
$$g = V\sum_{j=1}^{3} dx_j \otimes dx_j + \frac{1}{V} \eta \otimes \eta$$
is hyperkahler, and typically extends to the boundary of $U$.

== Examples ==
=== Quaternions ===
The usual (flat) metric on the quaternions $\mathbb{H} \cong \mathbb{C}^2$ is hyperkahler. It can be obtained as a result of the Gibbons-Hawking ansatz applied to the open subset $U = \mathbb{R}^3\setminus \{0\}$ and the harmonic function $V(x) = \frac{1}{2|x|}$.

=== ALE gravitational instantons ===
The ALE gravitational instanton of type $A_{k-1}$ can be obtained by applying the Gibbons-Hawking ansatz to the open subset $U = \mathbb{R}^3 \setminus \{p_1, \ldots, p_k \}$ for $k$ distinct collinear points $p_1, \ldots, p_k$ and the harmonic function $V(x) = \sum_{j=1}^{k}\frac{1}{2|x-p_j|}$. In the case $k=2$, we recover the Eguchi-Hanson metric on $T^*\mathbb{P}^1$.

== See also ==
- Gibbons–Hawking space
- Ooguri–Vafa metric
