= Gravitational instanton =

Four-dimensional complete Riemannian manifold satisfying the vacuum Einstein equations

In mathematical physics and differential geometry, a gravitational instanton is a four-dimensional complete Riemannian manifold satisfying the vacuum Einstein equations. They are so named because they are analogues in quantum theories of gravity of instantons in Yang–Mills theory. In accordance with this analogy with self-dual Yang–Mills instantons, gravitational instantons are usually assumed to look like four dimensional Euclidean space at large distances, and to have a self-dual Riemann tensor. Mathematically, this means that they are asymptotically locally Euclidean (or perhaps asymptotically locally flat) hyperkähler 4-manifolds, and in this sense, they are special examples of Einstein manifolds. From a physical point of view, a gravitational instanton is a non-singular solution of the vacuum Einstein equations with positive-definite, as opposed to Lorentzian, metric.

There are many possible generalizations of the original conception of a gravitational instanton: for example one can allow gravitational instantons to have a nonzero cosmological constant or a Riemann tensor which is not self-dual. One can also relax the boundary condition that the metric is asymptotically Euclidean.

There are many methods for constructing gravitational instantons, including the Gibbons–Hawking Ansatz, twistor theory, and the hyperkähler quotient construction.

== Introduction ==
Gravitational instantons are interesting, as they offer insights into the quantization of gravity. For example, positive definite asymptotically locally Euclidean metrics are needed as they obey the positive-action conjecture; actions that are unbounded below create divergence in the quantum path integral.

- A four-dimensional Ricci-flat Kähler manifold has anti-self-dual Riemann tensor with respect to the complex orientation.
- Consequently, a simply-connected anti-self-dual gravitational instanton is a four-dimensional complete hyperkähler manifold.
- Gravitational instantons are analogous to self-dual Yang–Mills instantons.

Several distinctions can be made with respect to the structure of the Riemann curvature tensor, pertaining to flatness and self-duality. These include:

- Einstein (non-zero cosmological constant)
- Ricci flatness (vanishing Ricci tensor)
- Conformal flatness (vanishing Weyl tensor)
- Self-duality
- Anti-self-duality
- Conformally self-dual
- Conformally anti-self-dual

== Taxonomy ==
By specifying the 'boundary conditions', i.e. the asymptotics of the metric 'at infinity' on a noncompact Riemannian manifold, gravitational instantons are divided into a few classes, such as asymptotically locally Euclidean spaces (ALE spaces), asymptotically locally flat spaces (ALF spaces).

They can be further characterized by whether the Riemann tensor is self-dual, whether the Weyl tensor is self-dual, or neither; whether or not they are Kähler manifolds; and various characteristic classes, such as Euler characteristic, the Hirzebruch signature (Pontryagin class), the Rarita–Schwinger index (spin-3/2 index), or generally the Chern class. The ability to support a spin structure (i.e. to allow consistent Dirac spinors) is another appealing feature.

== List of examples ==
Eguchi et al. list a number of examples of gravitational instantons. These include, among others:

- Flat space $\mathbb{R}^4$, the torus $\mathbb{T}^4$ and the Euclidean de Sitter space $\mathbb{S}^4$, i.e. the standard metric on the 4-sphere.
- The product of spheres $S^2\times S^2$.
- The Schwarzschild metric $\mathbb{R}^2\times S^2$ and the Kerr metric $\mathbb{R}^2\times S^2$.
- The Eguchi–Hanson instanton $T^*\mathbb{CP}(1)$, given below.
- The Taub–NUT solution, given below.
- The Fubini–Study metric on the complex projective plane $\mathbb{CP}(2).$ Note that the complex projective plane does not support well-defined Dirac spinors. That is, it is not a spin structure. It can be given a spin^{c} structure, however.
- The Page space, which exhibits an explicit Einstein metric on the connected sum of two oppositely oriented complex projective planes $\mathbb{CP}(2)\# \overline{\mathbb{CP}}(2)$.
- The Gibbons–Hawking multi-center metrics, given below.
- The Taub-bolt metric $\mathbb{CP}(2)\setminus \{0\}$ and the rotating Taub-bolt metric. The "bolt" metrics have a cylindrical-type coordinate singularity at the origin, as compared to the "nut" metrics, which have a sphere coordinate singularity. In both cases, the coordinate singularity can be removed by switching to Euclidean coordinates at the origin.
- The K3 surfaces.
- The ALE (asymptotically locally Euclidean) anti-self-dual manifolds. Among these, the simply connected ones are all hyper-Kähler, and each one is asymptotic to a flat cone over $S^3=SU(2)$ modulo a finite subgroup. Each finite sub-group of $SU(2)$ actually occurs. The complete list of possibilities consists of the cyclic groups $\mathbb{Z}_{k+1}$ together with the inverse images of the dihedral groups, the tetrahedral group, the octahedral group, and the icosahedral group under the double cover $SU(2) \to SO(3)$. Note that $\mathbb{Z}_{2}$ corresponds to the Eguchi–Hanson instanton, while for higher k, the cyclic group $\mathbb{Z}_{k+1}$ corresponds to the Gibbons–Hawking multi-center metrics, each of which diffeomorphic to the space obtained from the disjoint union of k copies of $T^*S^2$ by using the Dynkin diagram $A_k$ as a plumbing diagram.

This is a very incomplete list; there are many other possibilities, not all of which have been classified.

== Examples ==
It will be convenient to write the gravitational instanton solutions below using left-invariant 1-forms on the three-sphere S^{3} (viewed as the group Sp(1) or SU(2)). These can be defined in terms of Euler angles by

$$\begin{align}
\sigma_1 &= \sin \psi \, d \theta - \cos \psi \sin \theta \, d \phi \\
\sigma_2 &= \cos \psi \, d \theta + \sin \psi \sin \theta \, d \phi \\
\sigma_3 &= d \psi + \cos \theta \, d \phi. \\
\end{align}$$

Note that $d\sigma_i + \sigma_j \wedge \sigma_k=0$ for $i,j,k=1,2,3$ cyclic.

=== Taub–NUT metric ===
$$ds^2 = \frac{1}{4} \frac{r+n}{r-n} dr^2 + \frac{r-n}{r+n} n^2 {\sigma_3}^2 + \frac{1}{4}(r^2 - n^2)({\sigma_1}^2 + {\sigma_2}^2)$$

=== Eguchi–Hanson metric ===
The Eguchi–Hanson space is defined by a metric on the cotangent bundle of the 2-sphere $T^*\mathbb{CP}(1)=T^*S^2$. This metric is

$$ds^2 = \left( 1 - \frac{a}{r^4} \right) ^{-1} dr^2 + \frac{r^2}{4} \left( 1 - \frac{a}{r^4} \right) {\sigma_3}^2 + \frac{r^2}{4} (\sigma_1^2 + \sigma_2^2),$$

where $r \ge a^{1/4}$. This metric is smooth everywhere if it has no conical singularity at $r \rightarrow a^{1/4}$, $\theta = 0, \pi$. For $a = 0$ this happens if $\psi$ has a period of $4\pi$, which gives a flat metric on R^{4}; However, for $a \ne 0$ this happens if $\psi$ has a period of $2\pi$.

Asymptotically (i.e., in the limit $r \rightarrow \infty$) the metric looks like

$$ds^2 = dr^2 + \frac{r^2}{4} \sigma_3^2 + \frac{r^2}{4} (\sigma_1^2 + \sigma_2^2)$$

which naively seems as the flat metric on R^{4}. However, for $a \ne 0$, $\psi$ has only half the usual periodicity, as we have seen. Thus the metric is asymptotically R^{4} with the identification $\psi\, {\sim}\, \psi + 2\pi$, which is a Z_{2} subgroup of SO(4), the rotation group of R^{4}. Therefore, the metric is said to be asymptotically R^{4}/Z_{2}.

There is a transformation to another coordinate system, in which the metric looks like

$$ds^2 = \frac{1}{V(\mathbf{x})} ( d \psi + \boldsymbol{\omega} \cdot d \mathbf{x})^2 + V(\mathbf{x}) d \mathbf{x} \cdot d \mathbf{x},$$

where $\nabla V = \pm \nabla \times \boldsymbol{\omega}, \quad V = \sum_{i=1}^2 \frac{1}{|\mathbf{x}-\mathbf{x}_i| }.$

(For a = 0, $V = \frac{1}{|\mathbf{x}|}$, and the new coordinates are defined as follows: one first defines $\rho=r^2/4$ and then parametrizes $\rho$, $\theta$ and $\phi$ by the R^{3} coordinates $\mathbf{x}$, i.e. $\mathbf{x}=(\rho \sin \theta \cos \phi, \rho \sin \theta \sin \phi,\rho \cos\theta)$).

In the new coordinates, $\psi$ has the usual periodicity $\psi\ {\sim}\ \psi + 4\pi.$

One may replace V by

$$\quad V = \sum_{i=1}^n \frac{1}{|\mathbf{x} - \mathbf{x}_i|}.$$

For some n points $\mathbf{x}_i$, i = 1, 2..., n. This gives a multi-center Eguchi–Hanson gravitational instanton, which is again smooth everywhere if the angular coordinates have the usual periodicities (to avoid conical singularities). The asymptotic limit ($r\rightarrow \infty$) is equivalent to taking all $\mathbf{x}_i$ to zero, and by changing coordinates back to r, $\theta$ and $\phi$, and redefining $r\rightarrow r/\sqrt{n}$, we get the asymptotic metric

$$ds^2 = dr^2 + \frac{r^2}{4} \left({d\psi\over n} + \cos \theta \, d\phi\right)^2 + \frac{r^2}{4} [(\sigma_1^L)^2 + (\sigma_2^L)^2].$$

This is R^{4}/Z_{n} = C^{2}/Z_{n}, because it is R^{4} with the angular coordinate $\psi$ replaced by $\psi/n$, which has the wrong periodicity ($4\pi/n$ instead of $4\pi$). In other words, it is R^{4} identified under $\psi\ {\sim}\ \psi + 4\pi k/n$, or, equivalently, C^{2} identified under z_{i} ~ $e^{2\pi i k/n}$ z_{i} for i = 1, 2.

To conclude, the multi-center Eguchi–Hanson geometry is a Kähler Ricci flat geometry which is asymptotically C^{2}/Z_{n}. According to Yau's theorem this is the only geometry satisfying these properties. Therefore, this is also the geometry of a C^{2}/Z_{n} orbifold in string theory after its conical singularity has been smoothed away by its "blow up" (i.e., deformation).

=== Gibbons–Hawking multi-centre metrics ===
The Gibbons–Hawking multi-center metrics are given by

$$ds^2 = \frac{1}{V(\mathbf{x})} ( d \tau + \boldsymbol{\omega} \cdot d \mathbf{x})^2 + V(\mathbf{x}) d \mathbf{x} \cdot d \mathbf{x},$$

where

$$\nabla V = \pm \nabla \times \boldsymbol{\omega}, \quad V = \varepsilon + 2M \sum_{i=1}^{k} \frac{1}{|\mathbf{x} - \mathbf{x}_i | }.$$

Here, $\epsilon = 1$ corresponds to multi-Taub–NUT, $\epsilon = 0$ and $k = 1$ is flat space, and $\epsilon = 0$ and $k = 2$ is the Eguchi–Hanson solution (in different coordinates).

== See also ==
- Gravitational anomaly
- Hyperkähler manifold
