= AGT correspondence =

Correspondence between a conformal and superconformal theory

In theoretical physics, the AGT correspondence is a relationship between Liouville field theory on a punctured Riemann surface and a certain four-dimensional SU(2) gauge theory obtained by compactifying the 6D (2,0) superconformal field theory on the surface. The relationship was discovered by Luis Alday, Davide Gaiotto, and Yuji Tachikawa in 2009. It was soon extended to a more general relationship between A_{N-1} Toda field theory and SU(N) gauge theories. The idea of the AGT correspondence has also been extended to describe relationships between three-dimensional theories.
