= Weak gravity conjecture =

Conjecture that gravity must be the weakest force

In theoretical physics, the weak gravity conjecture (WGC) is a conjecture regarding the strength gravity can have in a theory of quantum gravity relative to the gauge forces in that theory. It roughly states that gravity should be the weakest force in any consistent theory of quantum gravity. It was first proposed by Nima Arkani-Hamed, Luboš Motl, Alberto Nicolis, and Cumrun Vafa in 2007.

Gravity when compared to a U(1) gauge group interaction like electromagnetism, the mildest version of the weak gravity conjecture implies that there exist an object with electric charge q and mass m such that

$$\frac{|q|}{m}\geq\left.\frac{|Q|}{M}\right|_{\text{ext}}$$

where $\left.Q/M\right|_{\text{ext}}$ is the charge-to-mass ratio of an arbitrary large black hole.

The conjecture was originally motivated by the fact that black holes should be able to decay. This insensitivity of black hole evaporation to its electric charge suggests that black holes can violate global symmetries and violate global charge conservation.

== See also ==
- Fundamental interaction
- Swampland (physics)
