= Eguchi–Hanson space =

Concept in mathematics and theoretical physics

In mathematics and theoretical physics, the Eguchi–Hanson space is a non-compact, self-dual, asymptotically locally Euclidean (ALE) metric on the cotangent bundle of the 2-sphere T^{*}S^{2}. The holonomy group of this 4-real-dimensional manifold is SU(2). The metric is generally attributed to the physicists Tohru Eguchi and Andrew J. Hanson; it was discovered independently by the mathematician Eugenio Calabi around the same time in 1979.

The Eguchi-Hanson metric has Ricci tensor equal to zero, making it a solution to the vacuum Einstein equations of general relativity, albeit with Riemannian rather than Lorentzian metric signature. It may be regarded as a resolution of the A_{1} singularity according to the ADE classification which is the singularity at the fixed point of the C^{2}/Z_{2} orbifold where the Z_{2} group inverts the signs of both complex coordinates in C^{2}. The even dimensional space C^{d/2}/Z_{d/2} of (real-)dimension $d$ can be described using complex coordinates $w_i \in \mathbb C^{d/2}$ with a metric

$$g_{i \bar j} = \bigg(1+\frac{\rho^d}{r^{d}}\bigg)^{2/d}\bigg[\delta_{i\bar j}-\frac{\rho^d \bar w_i  w_{\bar j}}{r^2(\rho^d+r^{d})}\bigg],$$

where $\rho$ is a scale setting constant and $r^2 = |w|^2_{\mathbb C^{d/2}}$.

Aside from its inherent importance in pure geometry, the space is important in string theory. Certain types of K3 surfaces can be approximated as a combination of several Eguchi–Hanson metrics since both have the same holonomy group. Similarly, the space can also be used to construct Calabi–Yau manifolds by replacing the orbifold singularities of $T^6/\mathbb Z_3$ with Eguchi–Hanson spaces.

The Eguchi–Hanson metric is the prototypical example of a gravitational instanton; detailed expressions for the metric are given in that article. It is then an example of a hyperkähler manifold.
