= Yukawa Institute for Theoretical Physics =

Research institute in Kyoto University, Japan

Coordinates: 35°1′50.7″N 135°47′9″E

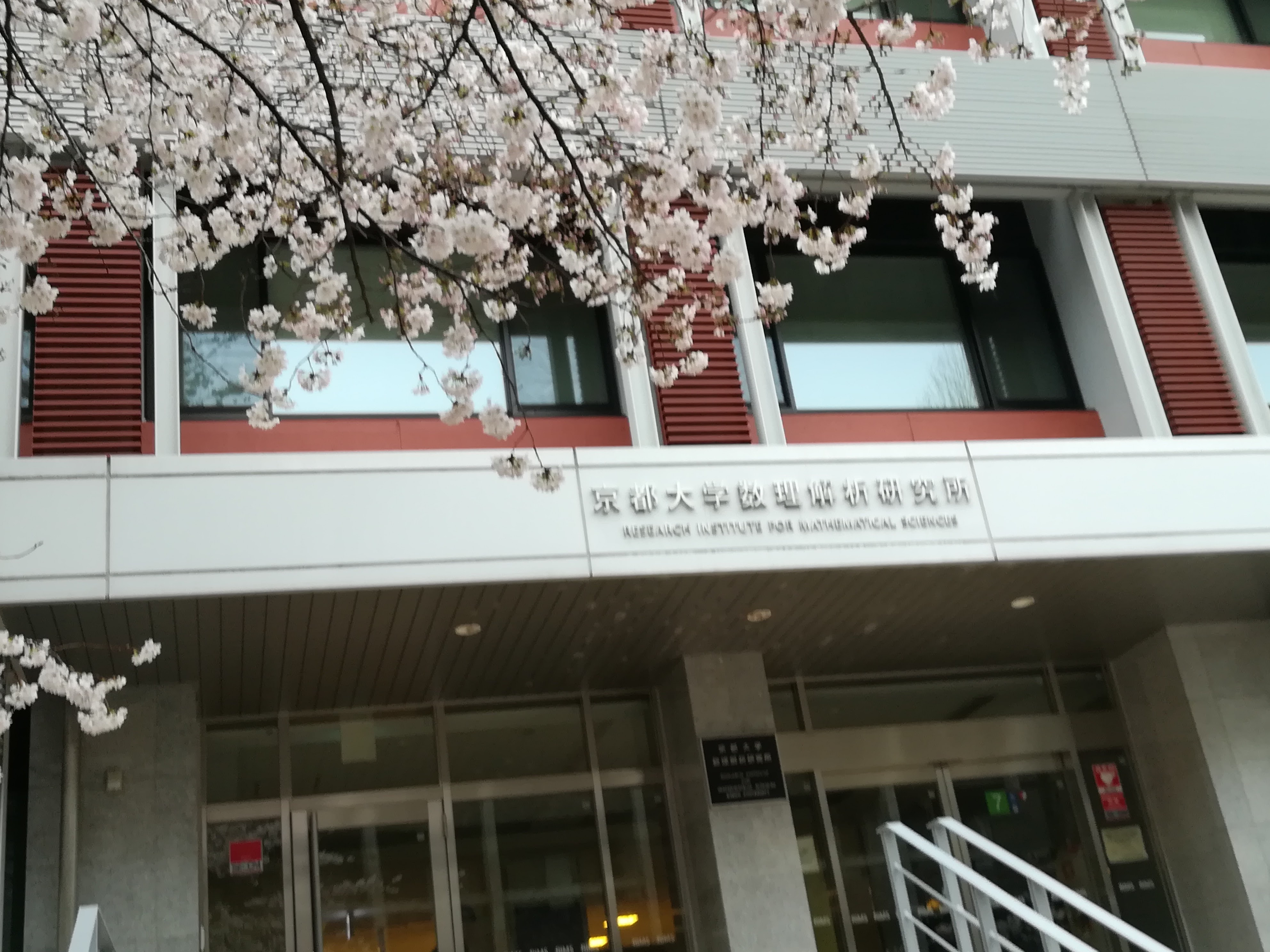

The Yukawa Institute for Theoretical Physics (基礎物理学研究所, kiso butsurigaku kenkyūsho) is a research institute in the field of theoretical physics, attached to Kyoto University in Japan. It was inaugurated in 1952. While the center is often referred to as "YITP", this can be confusing as YITP also stands for the C. N. Yang Institute for Theoretical Physics at Stony Brook University in the United States.

== Early history ==
In 1949, Japanese theoretical physicist Hideki Yukawa was awarded the Nobel Prize in Physics. He became the first Japanese citizen to receive the Nobel Prize. To commemorate this historic event, the president of Kyoto University immediately proposed to create a memorial hall on campus for Yukawa. In 1950, the Science Council of Japan unanimously resolved a request to the central government to allocate a special funding for the promotion of research in theoretical physics. Enthusiastic discussions among Japanese physicists followed in support for the idea of creating a new institution, similar to the Niels Bohr Institute in Copenhagen or the Institute for Advanced Study in Princeton, New Jersey.

Yukawa Hall was inaugurated in 1952 and in 1953, it became the Research Institute for Fundamental Physics (RIFP). Hideki Yukawa was appointed as the first director of the institute. He led the institute until his retirement in 1970.

== Research Institute for Fundamental Physics (1953-1990) ==
Research Institute for Fundamental Physics was a new type of national research center for theoretical physics with its facilities open for research collaborations by the community of theoretical physicists in Japan. The institute adopted a new system for its operation. Although it formally belongs to Kyoto University, its basic policy has been decided by the representatives of physicists elected from all over the country with institute's own academic staff. One of the unique roles played by the institute was to provide a forum for physicists on problems at the forefront of research in theoretical physics. Many physicists participated in the organization of topical workshops and international conferences at RIFP and stayed to work in collaboration with others. These traditions are still carried by the Yukawa Institute.

The institute started with four academic staff including Yukawa. The institute grew gradually; it had 13 academic positions in 1961. The research activity extended over areas of theoretical physics. Those areas were condensed matter theory, field theory, nuclear theory, particle theory, statistical mechanics, and nuclear and relativistic astrophysics. In 1980 it added two more academic positions for new research areas: non-equilibrium statistical physics and non-linear physics. During this period, one visiting professor position was created to invite distinguished foreign physicists.

== Unification with the RITP in Hiroshima (1990) ==
The new English name, the Yukawa Institute for Theoretical Physics, was adopted after the unification of two institutions: the Research Institute for Theoretical Physics (RITP) of Hiroshima University and Research Institute for Fundamental Physics (RIFP).

RITP of Hiroshima University was founded in 1944 by Yoshitaka Mimura for the research of mathematical foundations of theoretical physics. On August 6, 1945, it lost two faculty members and a supporting staff, together with all its facilities, by the blast of the atomic bomb exploded over Hiroshima.

RITP was re-established in 1948 in Takehara, a quiet suburban town of Hiroshima near the water, and stayed there until it was dissolved by the unification in 1990.

A major expansion of the institute took place in 1990 when Research Institute for Fundamental Physics (RIFP) was joined by all academic staff members of the Research Institute for Theoretical Physics (RITP) of Hiroshima University. At the time of the unification, RITP had ten academic staff and its research area had expanded to include cosmology, general relativity, field theory, and particle theory.

== Present YITP ==
By the expansion of 1990, the size of the institute almost doubled in terms of the number of its own academic staffs. Unfortunately Yukawa Hall had no extra office or library space to accommodate the new members of the institute and the library assets from RITP. Temporary settings for new offices and library was arranged in the Uji campus of Kyoto University which is located about 20 km south of Yukawa Hall. Thus, Yukawa Institute became distributed over two distantly located buildings, Yukawa Hall on the Kitashirakawa campus and the Uji Research Center on the Uji campus.

In 1995, the completion of the new building of the Yukawa Institute, constructed next to Yukawa Hall, ended this inconvenient situation of having two geographically separated facilities of the institute. The Uji Research Center was closed at this time. The new building now houses the offices of all 22 academic staffs as well as those for visitors, postdoctoral fellows, students and supporting staffs in addition to the new large library and computing facilities. Yukawa Hall is still used for research conferences and workshops organized by the Yukawa Institute besides use for its administrative offices, including Director's, and for the editorial office of the Progress of Theoretical Physics, a journal of theoretical physics founded by Yukawa in 1946.

== Activity of YITP ==
YITP has been playing a major role in leading the research in theoretical physics and also providing research and collaborative facilities in Japan.

Every year, YITP host a number of workshops on various topics in fundamental physics, and accommodate domestic visitors from various institutions as well as those from foreign countries.

The activity of YITP covers a wide range of fields in contemporary theoretical physics: string theory, quantum field theory, gravity, cosmology, particle physics, astrophysics, nuclear physics, statistical physics, condensed matter physics and biophysics. YITP also encourage activities in creating a new interdisciplinary field of research at the forefront of modern theoretical physics.

== List of directors ==
- Hideki Yukawa (1953.8.1 - 1970.3.31)
- Ziro Maki (1970.4.1 - 1976.3.31)
- Humitaka Sato (1976.4.1 - 1980.3.31)
- Ziro Maki (1980.4.1 - 1986.3.31)
- Kazuhiko Nishijima (1986.4.1 - 1990.3.31)
- Yosuke Nagaoka (1990.4.1 - 1997.3.31)
- Toshihide Maskawa (1997.4.1 - 2003.3.31)
- Taichi Kugo (2003.4.1 - 2007.3.31)
- Tohru Eguchi (2007.3.31 - 2011.3.31)
- Taichi Kugo (2011.3.31 - 2013.3.31)
- Misao Sasaki (2013.4.1 - 2017.3.31)
- Sinya Aoki (2017.4.1 - present)

== See also ==
- Hideki Yukawa
- Kyoto University
- Progress of Theoretical Physics
- Institute for Theoretical Physics (disambiguation)
- Center for Theoretical Physics (disambiguation)
