= Non-invertible symmetry =

In physics, a non-invertible symmetry is a symmetry of a quantum field theory that is not described by a group, and which in particular does not have an inverse.

Non-invertible symmetries were first studied in 2-dimensional conformal field theory, where fusion categories govern the fusion rules, rather than a group.

Four-dimensional examples of non-invertible symmetries can be obtained from Maxwell theory with topological theta term, via a combination of its SL(2,Z) duality and a discrete subgroup of its electric or magnetic 1-form symmetry.
