= Spectral network =

In mathematics and supersymmetric gauge theory, spectral networks are "networks of trajectories on Riemann surfaces obeying certain local rules. Spectral networks arise naturally in four-dimensional N = 2 theories coupled to surface defects, particularly the theories of class S."
