= Nodal decomposition =

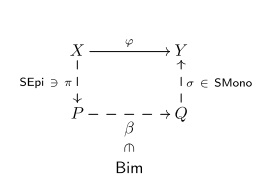
Nodal decomposition.

In category theory, an abstract mathematical discipline, a nodal decomposition of a morphism $\varphi:X\to Y$ is a representation of $\varphi$ as a product $\varphi=\sigma\circ\beta\circ\pi$, where $\pi$ is a strong epimorphism, $\beta$ a bimorphism, and $\sigma$ a strong monomorphism.

== Uniqueness and notations ==
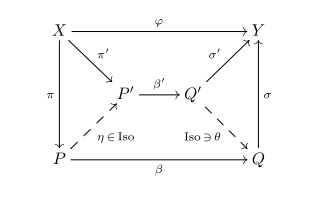
Uniqueness of the nodal decomposition.

If it exists, the nodal decomposition is unique up to an isomorphism in the following sense: for any two nodal decompositions $\varphi=\sigma\circ\beta\circ\pi$ and $\varphi=\sigma'\circ\beta'\circ\pi'$ there exist isomorphisms $\eta$ and $\theta$ such that

$$\pi'=\eta\circ\pi,$$
$$\beta=\theta\circ\beta'\circ\eta,$$
$$\sigma'=\sigma\circ\theta.$$

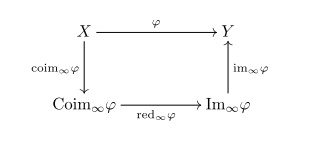
Notations.

This property justifies some special notations for the elements of the nodal decomposition:

$$\begin{align}
& \pi=\operatorname{coim}_\infty \varphi, &&
P=\operatorname{Coim}_\infty \varphi,\\
& \beta=\operatorname{red}_\infty \varphi, &&  \\
& \sigma=\operatorname{im}_\infty \varphi, &&
Q=\operatorname{Im}_\infty \varphi,
\end{align}$$

– here $\operatorname{coim}_\infty \varphi$ and $\operatorname{Coim}_\infty \varphi$ are called the nodal coimage of $\varphi$, $\operatorname{im}_\infty \varphi$ and $\operatorname{Im}_\infty \varphi$ the nodal image of $\varphi$, and $\operatorname{red}_\infty \varphi$ the nodal reduced part of $\varphi$.

In these notations the nodal decomposition takes the form

$$\varphi=\operatorname{im}_\infty \varphi\circ\operatorname{red}_\infty \varphi \circ \operatorname{coim}_\infty \varphi.$$

== Connection with the basic decomposition in pre-abelian categories ==
In a pre-abelian category ${\mathcal K}$ each morphism $\varphi$ has a standard decomposition

$$\varphi=\operatorname{im} \varphi\circ\operatorname{red} \varphi\circ\operatorname{coim} \varphi$$,

called the basic decomposition (here $\operatorname{im} \varphi=\ker(\operatorname{coker} \varphi)$, $\operatorname{coim} \varphi=\operatorname{coker}(\ker\varphi)$, and $\operatorname{red} \varphi$ are respectively the image, the coimage and the reduced part of the morphism $\varphi$).

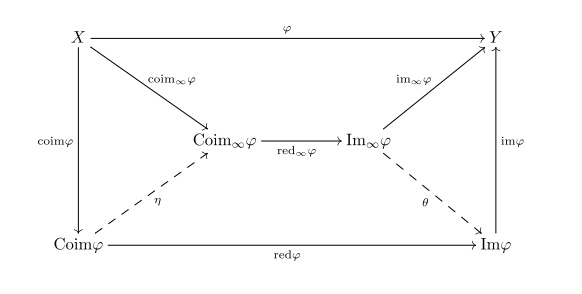
Nodal and basic decompositions.

If a morphism $\varphi$ in a pre-abelian category ${\mathcal K}$ has a nodal decomposition, then there exist morphisms $\eta$ and $\theta$ which (being not necessarily isomorphisms) connect the nodal decomposition with the basic decomposition by the following identities:

$$\operatorname{coim}_\infty \varphi=\eta\circ\operatorname{coim} \varphi,$$
$$\operatorname{red} \varphi=\theta\circ\operatorname{red}_\infty \varphi\circ\eta,$$
$$\operatorname{im}_\infty \varphi=\operatorname{im} \varphi\circ\theta.$$

== Categories with nodal decomposition ==
A category ${\mathcal K}$ is called a category with nodal decomposition if each morphism $\varphi$ has a nodal decomposition in ${\mathcal K}$. This property plays an important role in constructing envelopes and refinements in ${\mathcal K}$.

In an abelian category ${\mathcal K}$ the basic decomposition

$$\varphi=\operatorname{im} \varphi\circ\operatorname{red} \varphi\circ\operatorname{coim} \varphi$$

is always nodal. As a corollary, all abelian categories have nodal decomposition.

If a pre-abelian category ${\mathcal K}$ is linearly complete, well-powered in strong monomorphisms and co-well-powered in strong epimorphisms, then ${\mathcal K}$ has nodal decomposition.

More generally, suppose a category ${\mathcal K}$ is linearly complete, well-powered in strong monomorphisms, co-well-powered in strong epimorphisms, and in addition strong epimorphisms discern monomorphisms in ${\mathcal K}$, and, dually, strong monomorphisms discern epimorphisms in ${\mathcal K}$, then ${\mathcal K}$ has nodal decomposition.

The category Ste of stereotype spaces (being non-abelian) has nodal decomposition, as well as the (non-additive) category SteAlg of stereotype algebras .
