= Refinement =

Refinement may refer to:

== Mathematics ==
- Equilibrium refinement, the identification of actualized equilibria in game theory
- Refinement of an equivalence relation, in mathematics
  - Refinement (topology), the refinement of an open cover in mathematical topology
- Refinement (category theory)

== Other uses ==
- Refinement (computing), computer science approaches for designing correct computer programs and enabling their formal verification
- Refining, a process of purification
  - Refining (metallurgy)
- Refinement (culture), a quality of cultural sophistication
- Refinement (horse), a racehorse ridden by jockey Tony McCoy
