= Envelope (category theory) =

In category theory and related fields of mathematics, an envelope is a construction that generalizes the operations of "exterior completion", like completion of a locally convex space, or Stone–Čech compactification of a topological space. A dual construction is called refinement.

== Definition ==
Suppose $K$ is a category, $X$ an object in $K$, and $\Omega$ and $\Phi$ two classes of morphisms in $K$. The definition of an envelope of $X$ in the class $\Omega$ with respect to the class $\Phi$ consists of two steps.

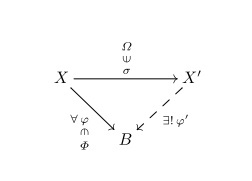
Extension.

- A morphism $\sigma:X\to X'$ in $K$ is called an extension of the object $X$ in the class of morphisms $\Omega$ with respect to the class of morphisms $\Phi$, if $\sigma\in\Omega$, and for any morphism $\varphi:X\to B$ from the class $\Phi$ there exists a unique morphism $\varphi':X'\to B$ in $K$ such that $\varphi=\varphi'\circ\sigma$.

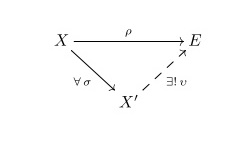
Envelope.

- An extension $\rho:X\to E$ of the object $X$ in the class of morphisms $\Omega$ with respect to the class of morphisms $\Phi$ is called an envelope of $X$ in $\Omega$ with respect to $\Phi$, if for any other extension $\sigma:X\to X'$ (of $X$ in $\Omega$ with respect to $\Phi$) there is a unique morphism $\upsilon:X'\to E$ in $K$ such that $\rho=\upsilon\circ\sigma$. The object $E$ is also called an envelope of $X$ in $\Omega$ with respect to $\Phi$.

Notations:

$\rho=\text{env}_{\Phi}^{\Omega}X, \qquad E=\text{Env}_{\Phi}^{\Omega}X.$

In a special case when $\Omega$ is a class of all morphisms whose ranges belong to a given class of objects $L$ in $K$ it is convenient to replace $\Omega$ with $L$ in the notations (and in the terms):

$\rho=\text{env}_{\Phi}^L X, \qquad E=\text{Env}_{\Phi}^L X.$

Similarly, if $\Phi$ is a class of all morphisms whose ranges belong to a given class of objects $M$ in $K$ it is convenient to replace $\Phi$ with $M$ in the notations (and in the terms):

$\rho=\text{env}_M^{\Omega} X, \qquad E=\text{Env}_M^{\Omega} X.$

For example, one can speak about an envelope of $X$ in the class of objects $L$ with respect to the class of objects $M$:

$\rho=\text{env}_M^L X, \qquad E=\text{Env}_M^L X.$

== Nets of epimorphisms and functoriality ==
Suppose that to each object $X\in\operatorname{Ob}({K})$ in a category ${K}$ it is assigned a subset ${\mathcal N}^X$ in the class $\operatorname{Epi}^X$ of all epimorphisms of the category ${K}$, going from $X$, and the following three requirements are fulfilled:

- for each object $X$ the set ${\mathcal N}^X$ is non-empty and is directed to the left with respect to the pre-order inherited from $\operatorname{Epi}^X$

$$\forall \sigma,\sigma'\in {\mathcal N}^X\quad \exists\rho\in{\mathcal N}^X\quad
\rho\to\sigma\ \& \ \rho\to\sigma',$$

- for each object $X$ the covariant system of morphisms generated by ${\mathcal N}^X$

$$\{\iota_\rho^\sigma;\ \rho,\sigma\in{\mathcal N}^X,\ \rho\to\sigma\}$$

has a colimit $\varprojlim {\mathcal N}^X$ in $K$, called the local limit in $X$;

- for each morphism $\alpha:X\to Y$ and for each element $\tau\in{\mathcal N}^Y$ there are an element $\sigma\in{\mathcal N}^X$ and a morphism $\alpha_\sigma^\tau:\operatorname{Cod}\sigma\to\operatorname{Cod}\tau$ such that

$$\tau\circ\alpha=\alpha_\sigma^\tau\circ\sigma.$$

Then the family of sets ${\mathcal N}=\{{\mathcal N}^X;\ X\in\operatorname{Ob}({K})\}$ is called a net of epimorphisms in the category ${K}$.

Examples.

1. For each locally convex topological vector space $X$ and for each closed convex balanced neighbourhood of zero $U\subseteq X$ let us consider its kernel $\operatorname{Ker}U=\bigcap_{\varepsilon>0}\varepsilon\cdot U$ and the quotient space $X/\operatorname{Ker}U$ endowed with the normed topology with the unit ball $U+\operatorname{Ker}U$, and let $X/U=(X/\operatorname{Ker}U)^\blacktriangledown$ be the completion of $X/\operatorname{Ker}U$ (obviously, $X/U$ is a Banach space, and it is called the quotient Banach space of $X$ by $U$). The system of natural mappings $X\to X/U$ is a net of epimorphisms in the category $\text{LCS}$ of locally convex topological vector spaces.
2. For each locally convex topological algebra $A$ and for each submultiplicative closed convex balanced neighbourhood of zero $U\subseteq X$,

$$U\cdot U\subseteq U$$,

let us again consider its kernel $\operatorname{Ker}U=\bigcap_{\varepsilon>0}\varepsilon\cdot U$ and the quotient algebra $A/\operatorname{Ker}U$ endowed with the normed topology with the unit ball $U+\operatorname{Ker}U$, and let $A/U=(A/\operatorname{Ker}U)^\blacktriangledown$ be the completion of $A/\operatorname{Ker}U$ (obviously, $A/U$ is a Banach algebra, and it is called the quotient Banach algebra of $X$ by $U$). The system of natural mappings $A\to A/U$ is a net of epimorphisms in the category $\text{LCS}$ of locally convex topological algebras.

Theorem. Let ${\mathcal N}$ be a net of epimorphisms in a category ${K}$ that generates a class of morphisms $\varPhi$ on the inside:

$${\mathcal N} \subseteq \varPhi \subseteq \operatorname{Mor}({K}) \circ {\mathcal N}.$$

Then for any class of epimorphisms $\varOmega$ in $K$, which contains all local limits $\varprojlim {\mathcal N}^X$,

$$\{\varprojlim {\mathcal N}^X; \ X\in\operatorname{Ob}(K)\}\subseteq\varOmega\subseteq\operatorname{Epi}(K),$$

the following holds:

(i) for each object $X$ in ${K}$ the local limit $\varprojlim {\mathcal N}^X$ is an envelope $\operatorname{env}_\varPhi^\varOmega X$ in $\varOmega$ with respect to $\varPhi$:

$$\varprojlim {\mathcal N}^X=\operatorname{env}_\varPhi^\varOmega X,$$

(ii) the envelope $\operatorname{Env}_\varPhi^\varOmega$ can be defined as a functor.

Theorem. Let ${\mathcal N}$ be a net of epimorphisms in a category ${K}$ that generates a class of morphisms $\varPhi$ on the inside:

$${\mathcal N} \subseteq \varPhi \subseteq \operatorname{Mor}({K}) \circ {\mathcal N}.$$

Then for any monomorphically complementable class of epimorphisms $\varOmega$ in $K$ such that $K$ is co-well-powered in $\varOmega$ the envelope $\operatorname{Env}_\varPhi^\varOmega$ can be defined as a functor.

Theorem. Suppose a category $K$ and a class of objects $L$ have the following properties:

(i) $K$ is cocomplete,
(ii) $K$ has nodal decomposition,
(iii) $K$ is co-well-powered in the class $\operatorname{Epi}$,
(iv) $\operatorname{Mor}(K,L)$ goes from $K$:

$$\forall X\in\operatorname{Ob}(K)\quad \exists \varphi\in\operatorname{Mor}(K)\quad \operatorname{Dom}\varphi=X\quad\&\quad\operatorname{Cod}\varphi\in L$$,

(v) $L$ differs morphisms on the outside: for any two different parallel morphisms $\alpha\ne\beta:X\to Y$ there is a morphism $\varphi:Y\to Z\in L$ such that $\varphi\circ\alpha\ne\varphi\circ\beta$,
(vi) $L$ is closed with respect to passage to colimits,
(vii) $L$ is closed with respect to passage from the codomain of a morphism to its nodal image: if $\operatorname{Cod}\alpha\in L$, then $\operatorname{Im}_\infty\alpha\in L$.

Then the envelope $\operatorname{Env}_L^L$ can be defined as a functor.

== Examples ==
In the following list all envelopes can be defined as functors.

1. The completion $X^\blacktriangledown$ of a locally convex topological vector space $X$ is an envelope of $X$ in the category $\text{LCS}$ of all locally convex spaces with respect to the class $\text{Ban}$ of Banach spaces: $X^\blacktriangledown=\text{Env}_{\text{Ban}}^{\text{LCS}}X$. Obviously, $X^\blacktriangledown$ is the inverse limit of the quotient Banach spaces $X/U$ (defined above):

$$X^\blacktriangledown=\lim_{0\gets U}X/U.$$

2. The Stone–Čech compactification $\beta:X\to\beta X$ of a Tikhonov topological space $X$ is an envelope of $X$ in the category $\text{Tikh}$ of all Tikhonov spaces in the class $\text{Com}$ of compact spaces with respect to the same class $\text{Com}$: $\beta X=\text{Env}_{\text{Com}}^{\text{Com}}X.$
3. The Arens-Michael envelope $A^{\text{AM}}$ of a locally convex topological algebra $A$ with a separately continuous multiplication is an envelope of $A$ in the category $\text{TopAlg}$ of all (locally convex) topological algebras (with separately continuous multiplications) in the class $\text{TopAlg}$ with respect to the class $\text{Ban}$ of Banach algebras: $A^{\text{AM}}= \text{Env}_{\text{Ban}}^{\text{TopAlg}}A$. The algebra $A^{\text{AM}}$ is the inverse limit of the quotient Banach algebras $A/U$ (defined above):

$$A^{\text{AM}}=\lim_{0\gets U}A/U.$$

4. The holomorphic envelope $\text{Env}_{\cal O} A$ of a stereotype algebra $A$ is an envelope of $A$ in the category $\text{SteAlg}$ of all stereotype algebras in the class $\text{DEpi}$ of all dense epimorphisms in $\text{SteAlg}$ with respect to the class $\text{Ban}$ of all Banach algebras: $\text{Env}_{\cal O} A= \text{Env}_{\text{Ban}}^{\text{DEpi}}A.$
5. The smooth envelope $\text{Env}_{\cal E} A$ of a stereotype algebra $A$ is an envelope of $A$ in the category $\text{InvSteAlg}$ of all involutive stereotype algebras in the class $\text{DEpi}$ of all dense epimorphisms in $\text{InvSteAlg}$ with respect to the class $\text{DiffMor}$ of all differential homomorphisms into various C*-algebras with joined self-adjoined nilpotent elements: $\text{Env}_{\cal E} A= \text{Env}_{\text{DiffMor}}^{\text{DEpi}}A.$
6. The continuous envelope $\text{Env}_{\cal C} A$ of a stereotype algebra $A$ is an envelope of $A$ in the category $\text{InvSteAlg}$ of all involutive stereotype algebras in the class $\text{DEpi}$ of all dense epimorphisms in $\text{InvSteAlg}$ with respect to the class $\text{C}^*$ of all C*-algebras: $\text{Env}_{\cal C} A= \text{Env}_{\text{C}^*}^{\text{DEpi}}A.$

== Applications ==
Envelopes appear as standard functors in various fields of mathematics. Apart from the examples given above,

- the Gelfand transform $G_A:A\to C(\text{Spec} A)$ of a commutative involutive stereotype algebra $A$ is a continuous envelope of $A$;
- for each locally compact abelian group $G$ the Fourier transform $F_A:C^\star(G)\to C(\widehat{G})$ is a continuous envelope of the stereotype group algebra $C^\star(G)$ of measures with compact support on $G$.

In abstract harmonic analysis the notion of envelope plays a key role in the generalizations of the Pontryagin duality theory to the classes of non-commutative groups: the holomorphic, the smooth and the continuous envelopes of stereotype algebras (in the examples given above) lead respectively to the constructions of the holomorphic, the smooth and the continuous dualities in big geometric disciplines – complex geometry, differential geometry, and topology – for certain classes of (not necessarily commutative) topological groups considered in these disciplines (affine algebraic groups, and some classes of Lie groups and Moore groups).

== See also ==
- Refinement
