= Leonid I. Vainerman =

Ukrainian and French mathematician

- Леонiд Йосипович Вайнерман
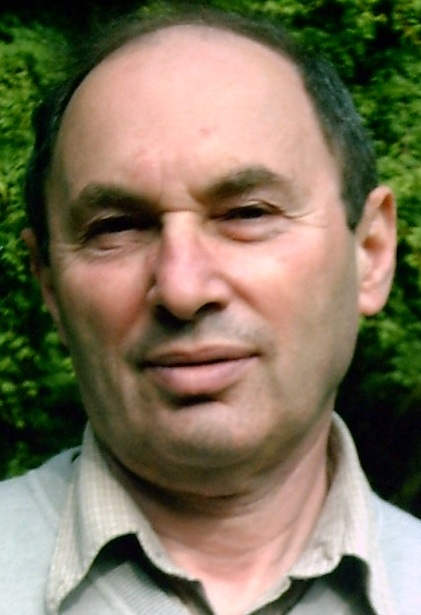
- Born: November 15, 1946; Kyiv, Ukraine
- Education: Taras Shevchenko National University of Kyiv, Institute of Mathematics of National Academy of Sciences of Ukraine
- Employer: University of Caen Normandy
- Known for: Kac algebras, quantum groups, quantum hypergroups and quantum groupoids
- Children: 1
- Scientific career
- Fields: mathematical physics, functional analysis, algebra
- Workplaces: Taras Shevchenko National University of Kyiv, International Solomon University, Pierre and Marie Curie University, Katholieke Universiteit Leuven, Max Planck Institute for Mathematics, University of Strasbourg, University of Caen Normandy
- Thesis: Boundary value problems for second order differential equations in a Hilbert space (1974)
- Doctoral advisor: Myroslav L. Gorbachuk
- Website: vainerman.users.lmno.cnrs.fr

Leonid Iosifovich Vainerman (Ukrainian: Леонiд Йосипович Вайнерман; Russian: Леонид Иосифович Вайнерман; alternative spelling: Leonid Iosifovich Vaynerman; born November 15, 1946, in Kyiv, Ukraine) is a Ukrainian and French mathematician, professor emeritus at University of Caen Normandy. Vainerman's research results are in functional analysis, ordinary differential equations, operator theory, topological groups, Lie groups, and abstract harmonic analysis. In the 1970s, he co-developed Pontryagin-style dualities for non-commutative topological groups, a set of results that served as a precursor for the modern theory of quantum groups.

== Education and career ==
=== Degrees and appointments in Ukraine ===
Vainerman studied mathematics at the Taras Shevchenko National University of Kyiv and graduated in 1969. He completed his Ph.D. (Candidate of Sciences in the USSR) in 1974 at Institute of Mathematics of National Academy of Sciences of Ukraine under the direction of Myroslav Horbachuk (Gorbachuk). Vainerman was a professor at Taras Shevchenko National University of Kyiv until 1992. He was a professor at International Solomon University from 1992 to 2002.

=== Visiting France, Belgium and Germany ===
- From 1992 to 1995, Vainerman was a visiting researcher at Pierre and Marie Curie University (Paris VI). During this appointment, he had fruitful collaborations with Michel Enock and Richard Kerner.
- In 1999, Vainerman was a visiting researcher at Katholieke Universiteit Leuven, where he had a fruitful collaboration with Stefaan Vaes.
- From 1998 to 2002, Vainerman was a visiting researcher at Max Planck Institute for Mathematics in Bonn, Germany.
- From 2000 to 2002, Vainerman was a visiting professor at the University of Strasbourg in France, where he organized a prominent meeting of theoretical physicists and mathematicians. While there, he also collaborated with Dmitri Nikshych and Vladimir Turaev.

=== Permanent appointment in Caen ===
Vainerman joined the University of Caen Normandy as an associate professor in Nicolas Oresme Mathematics Laboratory, becoming a full professor in 2005. He directed three Ph.D. dissertations there (those of Pierre Fima, Camille Mével and Frank Taipe). He has been a professor emeritus at University of Caen Normandy since 2015. While at Caen, Vainerman collaborated with Dmitri Nikshych and Jean-Michel Vallin.

== Scientific contributions ==
In the 1970s, Vainerman collaborated with George I. Kac (Georgii Isaakovich Kac) on generalizations of Pontryagin duality to non-commutative groups and developed the concept now known as Kac algebras (distinct from Kac-Moody algebras).

According to the French mathematician Alain Connes,

The theory of Kac algebras and their duality, [was] elaborated independently by M. Enock and J. -M. Schwartz, and by G. I. Kac and L. I. Vainermann in the seventies. The subject has now reached a state of maturity

The two teams independently developed a general Pontryagin duality theory for all locally compact groups. The contributions of both teams are covered in the 1992 book by Michel Enock and Jean-Marie Schwartz on Kac algebras. Per Alain Connes, these results form "a general theory to characterize quantum groups among Hopf algebras, similar to the characterization of Lie groups among locally compact groups." As mentioned in the postface by Adrian Ocneanu to the book by Enock and Schwartz, Kac algebras and their actions on von Neumann algebras naturally arise in the theory of subfactors developed by Vaughan Jones.

In his subsequent research, Vainerman obtained results on C*-algebras, Hopf algebras and quantum groups, as well as quantum hypergroups and quantum groupoids. Vainerman's research advanced the theory of quantum groups, including structural results on C*-algebraic quantum groups and their actions on operator algebras. He has made notable contributions to the structure and classification of weak Hopf C*-algebras (sometimes described as quantum groupoids), with applications to topics such as subfactors, dynamical quantum groups, and the construction of knot invariants and 3-manifolds. His collaborative works include surveys and original research articles detailing the foundational theory and applications of finite quantum groupoids.

Vainerman is credited as a co-author or editor in more than 70 mathematics publications.

== Scientific leadership ==
Vainerman organized a meeting at the University of Strasbourg February 21–23, 2002 that assembled theoretical physicists and mathematicians specializing in quantum group and quantum groupoid applications in quantum theories beyond the Standard Model. Vainerman edited the proceedings of the meeting and had them published as a book in 2003.
