= Generator set =

Generator set may refer to:

- Diesel generator
- Engine-generator
- Generating set (mathematics)
