= Michel Enock =

French mathematician (1947–2025)

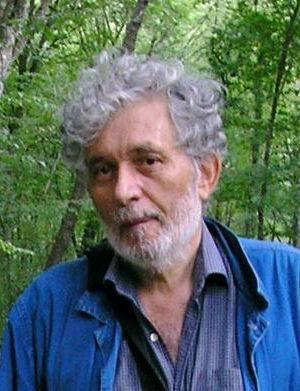
- Michel Enock, August 2005
- Born: Michel André Georges Enock Levi; 1 June 1947; Boulogne-Billancourt, France
- Died: 5 June 2025
- Education: Paris Diderot University; Pierre and Marie Curie University
- Known for: Kac algebras Pontryagin-style dualities for non-commutative topological groups
- Scientific career
- Fields: Mathematics, Functional analysis
- Workplaces: French National Centre for Scientific Research; Sorbonne Paris North University
- Thesis: Algèbre tensorielle, algèbre symétrique d’un espace hilbertien (1971)
- Doctoral advisor: Jacques Dixmier
- Doctoral students: 2
- Website: http://webusers.imj-prg.fr/~michel.enock

Michel Enock-Levi (1 June 1947 – 5 June 2025) was a French mathematician and a research director at CNRS, credited with the early development of Pontryagin-style dualities for non-commutative topological groups. Enock died in June 2025, at the age of 78.

== Scientific contributions ==
Enock is known for the 1992 book co-authored with Jean-Marie Schwartz on the subject of Kac algebras, (not to be confused with Kac-Moody algebras). According to the French mathematician Alain Connes, the book develops the general theory to characterize quantum groups among Hopf algebras, similar to the characterization of Lie groups among locally compact groups, "with emphasis on the analytical aspects of the subject instead of the purely algebraic ones". Further, Connes writes:

The theory of Kac algebras and their duality, [was] elaborated independently by M. Enock and J. -M. Schwartz, and by G. I. Kac and L. I. Vainermann in the seventies. The subject has now reached a state of maturity

Specifically, Enock co-developed a general Pontryagin duality theory for all locally compact groups.

== Scientific career ==
Enock completed his postgraduate thesis (1971) and state thesis (1976) at Pierre and Marie Curie University. In 1971, he became an assistant professor at the University of Paris 13 (Sorbonne Paris North University). From 1978, he was a Researcher at the French National Centre for Scientific Research (CNRS). He received accreditation to direct research at Paris Diderot University in 1985. He supervised two doctorate students.

Enock became a Director of Research at CNRS in 2000 and a First class Research Director in 2011. From 2012, he was emeritus Research Director at CNRS.
