= Fréchet algebra =

In mathematics, especially functional analysis, a Fréchet algebra, named after Maurice René Fréchet, is an associative algebra $A$ over the real or complex numbers that at the same time is also a (locally convex) Fréchet space. The multiplication operation $(a,b) \mapsto a*b$ for $a,b \in A$ is required to be jointly continuous. If $\{\| \cdot \|_n \}_{n=0}^\infty$ is an increasing family (Note: An increasing family means that for each $a \in A,$ $$\|a\|_0 \leq \|a\|_1 \leq \cdots \leq \| a \|_n \leq \cdots$$.) of seminorms for the topology of $A$, the joint continuity of multiplication is equivalent to there being a constant $C_n >0$ and integer $m \ge n$ for each $n$ such that $\left\| a b \right\|_n \leq C_n \left\| a \right\|_m \left\|b \right\|_m$ for all $a, b \in A$. (Note: Joint continuity of multiplication means that for every absolutely convex neighborhood $V$ of zero, there is an absolutely convex neighborhood $U$ of zero for which $U^2 \subseteq V,$ from which the seminorm inequality follows. Conversely, $$\begin{align} &{} \| a_k b_k -a b \|_n \\ &= \| a_k b_k - a b_k + a b_k - ab \|_n \\ &\leq \| a_k b_k - a b_k \|_n + \| a b_k - ab \|_n \\ &\leq C_n \biggl( \| a_k - a \|_m \|b_k\|_m  + \| a\|_m\| b_k - b \|_m \biggr) \\ &\leq C_n \biggl( \| a_k - a \|_m \|b\|_m + \| a_k -a\|_m \|b_k - b\|_m + \| a\|_m\| b_k - b \|_m \biggr). \end{align}$$) Fréchet algebras are also called B_{0}-algebras.

A Fréchet algebra is $m$-convex if there exists such a family of semi-norms for which $m=n$. In that case, by rescaling the seminorms, we may also take $C_n = 1$ for each $n$ and the seminorms are said to be submultiplicative: $\| a b \|_n \leq \| a \|_n \| b \|_n$ for all $a, b \in A.$ (Note: In other words, an $m$-convex Fréchet algebra is a topological algebra, in which the topology is given by a countable family of submultiplicative seminorms: $p(fg) \le p(f) p(g),$ and the algebra is complete.) $m$-convex Fréchet algebras may also be called Fréchet algebras.

A Fréchet algebra may or may not have an identity element $1_A$. If $A$ is unital, we do not require that $\|1_A\|_n=1,$ as is often done for Banach algebras.

== Properties ==
- Continuity of multiplication. Multiplication is separately continuous if $a_k b \to ab$ and $ba_k \to ba$ for every $a, b \in A$ and sequence $a_k \to a$ converging in the Fréchet topology of $A$. Multiplication is jointly continuous if $a_k \to a$ and $b_k \to b$ imply $a_k b_k \to ab$. Joint continuity of multiplication is part of the definition of a Fréchet algebra. For a Fréchet space with an algebra structure, if the multiplication is separately continuous, then it is automatically jointly continuous.
- Group of invertible elements. If $invA$ is the set of invertible elements of $A$, then the inverse map
  $$\begin{cases} invA \to invA \\ u \mapsto u^{-1} \end{cases}$$
  is continuous if and only if $invA$ is a $G_\delta$ set. Unlike for Banach algebras, $inv A$ may not be an open set. If $inv A$ is open, then $A$ is called a $Q$-algebra. (If $A$ happens to be non-unital, then we may adjoin a unit to $A$ (Note: If $A$ is an algebra over a field $k$, the unitization $A^+$ of $A$ is the direct sum $A \oplus k 1$, with multiplication defined as $(a+ \mu 1)(b + \lambda 1) = ab + \mu b + \lambda a + \mu \lambda 1.$) and work with $inv A^+$, or the set of quasi invertibles (Note: If $a \in A$, then $b \in A$ is a quasi-inverse for $a$ if $a + b -ab = 0$.) may take the place of $inv A$.)
- Conditions for $m$-convexity. A Fréchet algebra is $m$-convex if and only if for every, if and only if for one, increasing family $\{ \| \cdot \|_n \}_{n=0}^\infty$ of seminorms which topologize $A$, for each $m \in \N$ there exists $p \geq m$ and $C_m>0$ such that
  $$\| a_1 a_2 \cdots a_n \|_m \leq C_m^n \| a_1 \|_p \| a_2 \|_p \cdots \| a_n \|_p,$$
  for all $a_1, a_2, \dots, a_n \in A$ and $n \in \N$. A commutative Fréchet $Q$-algebra is $m$-convex, but there exist examples of non-commutative Fréchet $Q$-algebras which are not $m$-convex.
- Properties of $m$-convex Fréchet algebras. A Fréchet algebra is $m$-convex if and only if it is a countable projective limit of Banach algebras. An element of $A$ is invertible if and only if its image in each Banach algebra of the projective limit is invertible. (Note: If $A$ is non-unital, replace invertible with quasi-invertible.)

== Examples ==
- Zero multiplication. If $E$ is any Fréchet space, we can make a Fréchet algebra structure by setting $e * f = 0$ for all $e, f \in E$.
- Smooth functions on the circle. Let $S^1$ be the 1-sphere. This is a 1-dimensional compact differentiable manifold, with no boundary. Let $A=C^{\infty}(S^1)$ be the set of infinitely differentiable complex-valued functions on $S^1$. This is clearly an algebra over the complex numbers, for pointwise multiplication. (Use the product rule for differentiation.) It is commutative, and the constant function $1$ acts as an identity. Define a countable set of seminorms on $A$ by
  $$\left\| \varphi \right\|_{n} = \left \| \varphi^{(n)} \right \|_{\infty}, \qquad \varphi \in A,$$
  where
  $$\left \| \varphi^{(n)} \right \|_{\infty} = \sup_{x \in {S^1}} \left |\varphi^{(n)}(x) \right |$$
  denotes the supremum of the absolute value of the $n$th derivative $\varphi^{(n)}$. (Note: To see the completeness, let $\varphi_{k}$ be a Cauchy sequence. Then each derivative $\varphi_{k}^{(l)}$ is a Cauchy sequence in the sup norm on $S^1$, and hence converges uniformly to a continuous function $\psi_{l}$ on $S^1$. It suffices to check that $\psi_{l}$ is the $l$th derivative of $\psi_{0}$. But, using the fundamental theorem of calculus, and taking the limit inside the integral (using uniform convergence), we have $$\begin{align} &{} \psi_{l}(x) - \psi_{l}(x_{0}) \\ = &{} \lim_{k \to \infty}\left ( \varphi_{k}^{(l)}(x) - \varphi_{k}^{(l)}(x_{0})\right) \\ = &{} \lim_{k \to\infty} \int_{x_{0}}^{x} \varphi_{k}^{(l+1)}(t) dt \\ = &{} \int_{x_{0}}^{x} \psi_{l+1}(t) dt. \end{align}$$) Then, by the product rule for differentiation, we have
  $$\begin{align}
\| \varphi \psi \|_{n} &= \left \| \sum_{i = 0}^{n} {n \choose i} \varphi^{(i)} \psi^{(n-i)} \right \|_{\infty} \\
&\leq \sum_{i=0}^{n} {n \choose i} \| \varphi \|_{i} \| \psi \|_{n-i} \\
&\leq \sum_{i=0}^{n} {n \choose i} \| \varphi \|'_{n} \| \psi \|'_{n} \\
&=    2^n\| \varphi \|'_{n} \| \psi \|'_{n},
\end{align}$$
  where
  $${n \choose i} = \frac{n!}{{i! (n-i)!}},$$
  denotes the binomial coefficient and
  $$\| \cdot \|'_{n} = \max_{k \leq n} \| \cdot \|_{k}.$$
  The primed seminorms are submultiplicative after re-scaling by $C_n=2^n$.
- Sequences on $\N$. Let $\Complex^\N$ be the space of complex-valued sequences on the natural numbers $\N$. Define an increasing family of seminorms on $\Complex^\N$ by
  $$\| \varphi \|_n = \max_{k\leq n} |\varphi(k)|.$$
  With pointwise multiplication, $\Complex^\N$ is a commutative Fréchet algebra. In fact, each seminorm is submultiplicative $\| \varphi \psi \|_n \leq \| \varphi \|_n \| \psi \|_n$ for $\varphi, \psi \in A$. This $m$-convex Fréchet algebra is unital, since the constant sequence $1(k) = 1, k \in \N$ is in $A$.
- Equipped with the topology of uniform convergence on compact sets, and pointwise multiplication, $C(\Complex)$, the algebra of all continuous functions on the complex plane $\Complex$, or to the algebra $\mathrm{Hol}(\Complex)$ of holomorphic functions on $\Complex$.
- Convolution algebra of rapidly vanishing functions on a finitely generated discrete group. Let $G$ be a finitely generated group, with the discrete topology. This means that there exists a set of finitely many elements $U= \{ g_{1}, \dots, g_{n}\} \subseteq G$ such that:
  $$\bigcup_{n=0}^{\infty} U^n = G.$$
  Without loss of generality, we may also assume that the identity element $e$ of $G$ is contained in $U$. Define a function $\ell : G \to [0, \infty)$ by
  $$\ell(g) = \min \{ n \mid g \in U^n \}.$$
  Then $\ell(gh ) \leq \ell(g) + \ell(h)$, and $\ell(e) = 0$, since we define $U^{0} = \{ e \}$. (Note: We can replace the generating set $U$ with $U \cup U^{-1}$, so that $U=U^{-1}$. Then $\ell$ satisfies the additional property $\ell(g^{-1})=\ell(g)$, and is a length function on $G$.) Let $A$ be the $\Complex$-vector space
  $$S(G) = \biggr\{ \varphi : G \to \Complex \,\,\biggl|\,\, \| \varphi \|_{d} < \infty,\quad d = 0,1, 2, \dots \biggr\},$$
  where the seminorms $\| \cdot \|_{d}$ are defined by
  $$\| \varphi \|_{d} = \| \ell^d \varphi \|_{1} =\sum_{g \in G} \ell(g)^d |\varphi(g)|.$$
  (Note: To see that $A$ is Fréchet space, let $\varphi_{n}$ be a Cauchy sequence. Then for each $g \in G$, $\varphi_{n}(g)$ is a Cauchy sequence in $\Complex$. Define $\varphi(g)$ to be the limit. Then $$\begin{align} &\sum_{g\in S} \ell(g)^d | \varphi_{n}(g) - \varphi(g)| \\ & \leq \sum_{g\in S} \ell(g)^d | \varphi_{n}(g) - \varphi_{m}(g)|+ \sum_{g\in S} \ell(g)^d | \varphi_{m}(g) - \varphi(g) | \\ & \leq \| \varphi_n - \varphi_m \|_d + \sum_{g\in S} \ell(g)^d |\varphi_{m}(g) - \varphi(g) |, \end{align}$$ where the sum ranges over any finite subset $S$ of $G$. Let $\epsilon >0$, and let $K_{\epsilon}> 0$ be such that $\| \varphi_n - \varphi_m \|_{d} < \epsilon$ for $m, n \geq K_{\epsilon}$. By letting $m$ run, we have $$\sum_{g \in S} \ell(g)^d | \varphi_{n}(g) - \varphi(g)| < \epsilon$$ for $n \geq K_{\epsilon}$. Summing over all of $G$, we therefore have $\left\| \varphi_n - \varphi \right\|_d < \epsilon$ for $n \geq K_{\epsilon}$. By the estimate $$\begin{align} &{}\sum_{g\in S} \ell(g)^d | \varphi(g) | \\ &{} \leq \sum_{g\in S} \ell(g)^d | \varphi_{n}(g) - \varphi(g)|+ \sum_{g\in S} \ell(g)^d | \varphi_{n}(g) | \\ &{} \leq \| \varphi_n - \varphi\|_d + \| \varphi_n \|_{d}, \end{align}$$ we obtain $\| \varphi \|_{d} < \infty$. Since this holds for each $d \in \N$, we have $\varphi \in A$ and $\varphi_n \to \varphi$ in the Fréchet topology, so $A$ is complete.) $A$ is an $m$-convex Fréchet algebra for the convolution multiplication
  $$\varphi * \psi (g) = \sum_{h \in G} \varphi(h) \psi(h^{-1}g),$$
  (Note: $$\begin{align} & \| \varphi * \psi \|_{d} \\ & \leq \sum_{g \in G}\left ( \sum_{h \in G} \ell(g)^d |\varphi(h)| \left| \psi(h^{-1}g) \right| \right ) \\ &\leq \sum_{g, h \in G} \left (\ell(h) + \ell \left (h^{-1}g \right ) \right )^d |\varphi(h)| \left| \psi(h^{-1}g)\right| \\ &=  \sum_{i=0}^{d} {d \choose i} \left (\sum_{g, h \in G} \left |\ell^i \varphi(h) \right | \left |\ell^{d-i} \psi(h^{-1}g) \right | \right ) \\ &=  \sum_{i=0}^{d} {d \choose i} \left (\sum_{h \in G} \left |\ell^i \varphi(h) \right |\right)\left ( \sum_{g\in G} \left |\ell^{d-i} \psi(g) \right | \right) \\ &=  \sum_{i=0}^{d} {d \choose i} \| \varphi \|_{i} \| \psi \|_{d-i} \\ &\leq  2^d \| \varphi \|'_{d} \| \psi \|'_{d} \end{align}$$) $A$ is unital because $G$ is discrete, and $A$ is commutative if and only if $G$ is Abelian.
- Non $m$-convex Fréchet algebras. The Aren's algebra
  $$A = L^\omega[0,1] = \bigcap_{p \geq 1} L^p[0,1]$$
  is an example of a commutative non-$m$-convex Fréchet algebra with discontinuous inversion. The topology is given by $L^p$ norms
  $$\| f \|_p = \left ( \int_0^1 | f(t) |^p dt \right )^{1 / p}, \qquad f \in A,$$
  and multiplication is given by convolution of functions with respect to Lebesgue measure on $[0,1]$.

== Generalizations ==
We can drop the requirement for the algebra to be locally convex, but still a complete metric space. In this case, the underlying space may be called a Fréchet space or an F-space.

If the requirement that the number of seminorms be countable is dropped, the algebra becomes locally convex (LC) or locally multiplicatively convex (LMC). A complete LMC algebra is called an Arens-Michael algebra.

== Michael's Conjecture ==
The question of whether all linear multiplicative functionals on an $m$-convex Frechet algebra are continuous is known as Michael's Conjecture. This conjecture is perhaps the most famous open problem in the theory of topological algebras.

== Sources ==
- Fragoulopoulou, Maria (2005). "Bibliography". Topological Algebras with Involution. North-Holland Mathematics Studies. Vol. 200. Amsterdam: Elsevier B.V. pp. 451–485. doi:10.1016/S0304-0208(05)80031-3. ISBN 978-044452025-8.
- Husain, Taqdir (1991). Orthogonal Schauder Bases. Pure and Applied Mathematics. Vol. 143. New York City: Marcel Dekker. ISBN 0-8247-8508-8.
- Michael, Ernest A. (1952). Locally Multiplicatively-Convex Topological Algebras. Memoirs of the American Mathematical Society. Vol. 11. MR 0051444.
- Mitiagin, B.; Rolewicz, S.; Żelazko, W. (1962). "Entire functions in B_{0}-algebras". Studia Mathematica. 21 (3): 291–306. doi:10.4064/sm-21-3-291-306. MR 0144222.
- Palmer, T.W. (1994). Banach Algebras and the General Theory of *-algebras, Volume I: Algebras and Banach Algebras. Encyclopedia of Mathematics and its Applications. Vol. 49. New York City: Cambridge University Press. ISBN 978-052136637-3.
- Rudin, Walter (1973). Functional Analysis. Series in Higher Mathematics. New York City: McGraw-Hill Book. 1.8(e). ISBN 978-007054236-5 – via Internet Archive.
- Waelbroeck, Lucien (1971). Topological Vector Spaces and Algebras. Lecture Notes in Mathematics. Vol. 230. doi:10.1007/BFb0061234. ISBN 978-354005650-8. MR 0467234.
- Żelazko, W. (1965). "Metric generalizations of Banach algebras". Rozprawy Mat. (Dissertationes Math.). 47. Theorem 13.17. MR 0193532.
- Żelazko, W. (1994). "Concerning entire functions in B_{0}-algebras". Studia Mathematica. 110 (3): 283–290. doi:10.4064/sm-110-3-283-290. MR 1292849.
- Żelazko, W. (2001) [1994]. "Fréchet algebra". Encyclopedia of Mathematics. EMS Press.
