= Brauner space =

In functional analysis and related areas of mathematics a Brauner space is a complete compactly generated locally convex space $X$ having a sequence of compact sets $K_n$ such that every other compact set $T\subseteq X$ is contained in some $K_n$.

Brauner spaces are named after Kalman George Brauner, who began their study. All Brauner spaces are stereotype and are in the stereotype duality relations with Fréchet spaces:

- for any Fréchet space $X$ its stereotype dual space $X^\star$ is a Brauner space,
- and vice versa, for any Brauner space $X$ its stereotype dual space $X^\star$ is a Fréchet space.

Special cases of Brauner spaces are Smith spaces.

== Examples ==
- Let $M$ be a $\sigma$-compact locally compact topological space, and ${\mathcal C}(M)$ the Fréchet space of all continuous functions on $M$ (with values in ${\mathbb R}$ or ${\mathbb C}$), endowed with the usual topology of uniform convergence on compact sets in $M$. The dual space ${\mathcal C}^\star(M)$ of Radon measures with compact support on $M$ with the topology of uniform convergence on compact sets in ${\mathcal C}(M)$ is a Brauner space.
- Let $M$ be a smooth manifold, and ${\mathcal E}(M)$ the Fréchet space of all smooth functions on $M$ (with values in ${\mathbb R}$ or ${\mathbb C}$), endowed with the usual topology of uniform convergence with each derivative on compact sets in $M$. The dual space ${\mathcal E}^\star(M)$ of distributions with compact support in $M$ with the topology of uniform convergence on bounded sets in ${\mathcal E}(M)$ is a Brauner space.
- Let $M$ be a Stein manifold and ${\mathcal O}(M)$ the Fréchet space of all holomorphic functions on $M$ with the usual topology of uniform convergence on compact sets in $M$. The dual space ${\mathcal O}^\star(M)$ of analytic functionals on $M$ with the topology of uniform convergence on bounded sets in ${\mathcal O}(M)$ is a Brauner space.

In the special case when $M=G$ possesses a structure of a topological group the spaces ${\mathcal C}^\star(G)$, ${\mathcal E}^\star(G)$, ${\mathcal O}^\star(G)$ become natural examples of stereotype group algebras.

- Let $M\subseteq{\mathbb C}^n$ be a complex affine algebraic variety. The space ${\mathcal P}(M)={\mathbb C}[x_1,...,x_n]/\{f\in {\mathbb C}[x_1,...,x_n]:\ f\big|_M=0\}$ of polynomials (or regular functions) on $M$, being endowed with the strongest locally convex topology, becomes a Brauner space. Its stereotype dual space ${\mathcal P}^\star(M)$ (of currents on $M$) is a Fréchet space. In the special case when $M=G$ is an affine algebraic group, ${\mathcal P}^\star(G)$ becomes an example of a stereotype group algebra.
- Let $G$ be a compactly generated Stein group. The space ${\mathcal O}_{\exp}(G)$ of all holomorphic functions of exponential type on $G$ is a Brauner space with respect to a natural topology.

== See also ==
- Stereotype space
- Smith space
