= Generator (mathematics) =

Element of interest in an algebraic structure

The 5th roots of unity in the complex plane under multiplication form a group of order 5. Each non-identity element by itself is a generator for the whole group.

In mathematics and physics, the term generator or generating set may refer to any of a number of related concepts. The underlying concept in each case is that of a smaller set of objects, together with a set of operations that can be applied to it, that result in the creation of a larger collection of objects, called the generated set. The larger set is then said to be generated by the smaller set. It is commonly the case that the generating set has a simpler set of properties than the generated set, thus making it easier to discuss and examine. It is usually the case that properties of the generating set are in some way preserved by the act of generation; likewise, the properties of the generated set are often reflected in the generating set.

== List of generators ==
A list of examples of generating sets follow.

- Generating set or spanning set of a vector space: a set that spans the vector space
- Generating set of a group: a subset of a group that is not contained in any subgroup of the group other than the entire group
- Generating set of a ring: A subset S of a ring A generates A if the only subring of A containing S is A
- Generating set of an ideal in a ring
- Generating set of a module
- A generator, in category theory, is an object that can be used to distinguish morphisms
- In topology, a collection of sets that generate the topology is called a subbase
- Generating set of a topological algebra: S is a generating set of a topological algebra A if the smallest closed subalgebra of A containing S is A
- Generating a σ-algebra by a collection of subsets

== Differential equations ==
In the study of differential equations, and commonly those occurring in physics, one has the idea of a set of infinitesimal displacements that can be extended to obtain a manifold, or at least, a local part of it, by means of integration. The general concept is of using the exponential map to take the vectors in the tangent space and extend them, as geodesics, to an open set surrounding the tangent point. In this case, it is not unusual to call the elements of the tangent space the generators of the manifold. When the manifold possesses some sort of symmetry, there is also the related notion of a charge or current, which is sometimes also called the generator, although, strictly speaking, charges are not elements of the tangent space.

- Elements of the Lie algebra to a Lie group are sometimes referred to as "generators of the group," especially by physicists. The Lie algebra can be thought of as the infinitesimal vectors generating the group, at least locally, by means of the exponential map, but the Lie algebra does not form a generating set in the strict sense.
- In stochastic analysis, an Itō diffusion or more general Itō process has an infinitesimal generator.
- The generator of any continuous symmetry implied by Noether's theorem, the generators of a Lie group being a special case. In this case, a generator is sometimes called a charge or Noether charge, examples include:
  - angular momentum as the generator of rotations,
  - linear momentum as the generator of translations,
  - electric charge being the generator of the U(1) symmetry group of electromagnetism,
  - the color charges of quarks are the generators of the SU(3) color symmetry in quantum chromodynamics,
- More precisely, "charge" should apply only to the root system of a Lie group.

== See also ==
- Free object
- Generating function
- Lie theory
- Symmetry (physics)
- Supersymmetry
- Gauge theory
- Field (physics)
