= Quantum groupoid =

Constructs in non-commutative geometry

In mathematics, a quantum groupoid is any of a number of notions in noncommutative geometry analogous to the notion of groupoid. In usual geometry, the information of a groupoid can be contained in its monoidal category of representations (by a version of Tannaka–Krein duality), in its groupoid algebra or in the commutative Hopf algebroid of functions on the groupoid. Thus formalisms trying to capture quantum groupoids include certain classes of (autonomous) monoidal categories, Hopf algebroids etc.
