= Smith space =

In functional analysis and related areas of mathematics, a Smith space is a complete compactly generated locally convex topological vector space $X$ having a universal compact set, i.e. a compact set $K$ which absorbs every other compact set $T\subseteq X$ (i.e. $T\subseteq\lambda\cdot K$ for some $\lambda>0$).

Smith spaces are named after Marianne Ruth Freundlich Smith, who introduced them as duals to Banach spaces in some versions of duality theory for topological vector spaces. All Smith spaces are stereotype and are in the stereotype duality relations with Banach spaces:

- for any Banach space $X$ its stereotype dual space $X^\star$ is a Smith space,

- and vice versa, for any Smith space $X$ its stereotype dual space $X^\star$ is a Banach space.

Smith spaces are special cases of Brauner spaces.

== Examples ==
- As follows from the duality theorems, for any Banach space $X$ its stereotype dual space $X^\star$ is a Smith space. The polar $K=B^\circ$ of the unit ball $B$ in $X$ is the universal compact set in $X^\star$. If $X^*$ denotes the normed dual space for $X$, and $X'$ the space $X^*$ endowed with the $X$-weak topology, then the topology of $X^\star$ lies between the topology of $X^*$ and the topology of $X'$, so there are natural (linear continuous) bijections

$$X^*\to X^\star\to X'.$$

If $X$ is infinite-dimensional, then no two of these topologies coincide. At the same time, for infinite dimensional $X$ the space $X^\star$ is not barreled (and even is not a Mackey space if $X$ is reflexive as a Banach space).

- If $K$ is a convex balanced compact set in a locally convex space $Y$, then its linear span ${\mathbb C}K=\operatorname{span}(K)$ possesses a unique structure of a Smith space with $K$ as the universal compact set (and with the same topology on $K$).
- If $M$ is a (Hausdorff) compact topological space, and ${\mathcal C}(M)$ the Banach space of continuous functions on $M$ (with the usual sup-norm), then the stereotype dual space ${\mathcal C}^\star(M)$ (of Radon measures on $M$ with the topology of uniform convergence on compact sets in ${\mathcal C}(M)$) is a Smith space. In the special case when $M=G$ is endowed with a structure of a topological group the space ${\mathcal C}^\star(G)$ becomes a natural example of a stereotype group algebra.
- A Banach space $X$ is a Smith space if and only if $X$ is finite-dimensional.

== See also ==
- Stereotype space
- Brauner space
