= Refinement (category theory) =

In category theory and related fields of mathematics, a refinement is a construction that generalizes the operations of "interior enrichment", like bornologification or saturation of a locally convex space. A dual construction is called envelope.

== Definition ==
Suppose $K$ is a category, $X$ an object in $K$, and $\Gamma$ and $\Phi$ two classes of morphisms in $K$. The definition of a refinement of $X$ in the class $\Gamma$ by means of the class $\Phi$ consists of two steps.

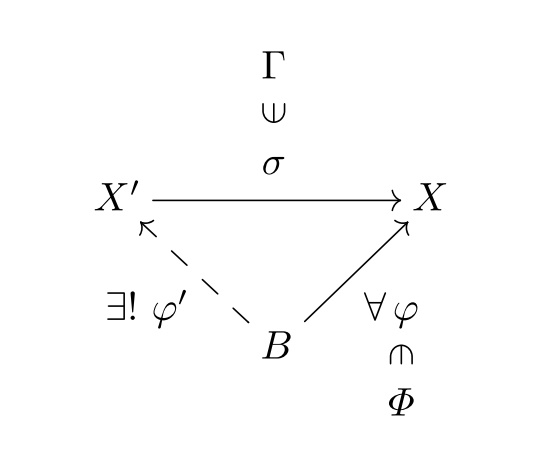
Enrichment

- A morphism $\sigma:X'\to X$ in $K$ is called an enrichment of the object $X$ in the class of morphisms $\Gamma$ by means of the class of morphisms $\Phi$, if $\sigma\in\Gamma$, and for any morphism $\varphi:B\to X$ from the class $\Phi$ there exists a unique morphism $\varphi':B\to X'$ in $K$ such that $\varphi=\sigma\circ\varphi'$.

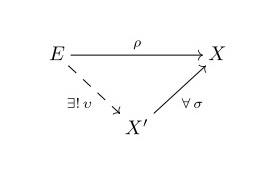
Refinement

- An enrichment $\rho:E\to X$ of the object $X$ in the class of morphisms $\Gamma$ by means of the class of morphisms $\Phi$ is called a refinement of $X$ in $\Gamma$ by means of $\Phi$, if for any other enrichment $\sigma:X'\to X$ (of $X$ in $\Gamma$ by means of $\Phi$) there is a unique morphism $\upsilon:E\to X'$ in $K$ such that $\rho=\sigma\circ\upsilon$. The object $E$ is also called a refinement of $X$ in $\Gamma$ by means of $\Phi$.

Notations:

$$\rho=\operatorname{ref}_\Phi^\Gamma X, \qquad
E=\operatorname{Ref}_\Phi^\Gamma X.$$

In a special case when $\Gamma$ is a class of all morphisms whose ranges belong to a given class of objects $L$ in $K$ it is convenient to replace $\Gamma$ with $L$ in the notations (and in the terms):

$$\rho=\operatorname{ref}_\Phi^L X, \qquad
E=\operatorname{Ref}_\Phi^L X.$$

Similarly, if $\Phi$ is a class of all morphisms whose ranges belong to a given class of objects $M$ in $K$ it is convenient to replace $\Phi$ with $M$ in the notations (and in the terms):

$$\rho=\operatorname{ref}_M^\Gamma X, \qquad
E=\operatorname{Ref}_M^\Gamma X.$$

For example, one can speak about a refinement of $X$ in the class of objects $L$ by means of the class of objects $M$:

$$\rho=\operatorname{ref}_M^L X, \qquad
E=\operatorname{Ref}_M^L X.$$

== Examples ==
1. The bornologification $X_{\operatorname{born}}$ of a locally convex space $X$ is a refinement of $X$ in the category $\operatorname{LCS}$ of locally convex spaces by means of the subcategory $\operatorname{Norm}$ of normed spaces: $X_{\operatorname{born}}=\operatorname{Ref}_{\operatorname{Norm}}^{\operatorname{LCS}}X$
2. The saturation $X^\blacktriangle$ of a pseudocomplete locally convex space $X$ is a refinement in the category $\operatorname{LCS}$ of locally convex spaces by means of the subcategory $\operatorname{Smi}$ of the Smith spaces: $X^\blacktriangle=\operatorname{Ref}_{\operatorname{Smi}}^{\operatorname{LCS}}X$

== See also ==
- Envelope
