= Topological algebra =

In mathematics, a topological algebra $A$ is an algebra and at the same time a topological space, where the algebraic and the topological structures are coherent in a specified sense.

== Definition ==
A topological algebra $A$ over a topological field $K$ is a topological vector space together with a bilinear multiplication

$$\cdot: A \times A \to A$$,
$$(a,b) \mapsto a \cdot b$$

that turns $A$ into an algebra over $K$ and is continuous in some definite sense. Usually the continuity of the multiplication is expressed by one of the following (non-equivalent) requirements:

- joint continuity: for each neighbourhood of zero $U\subseteq A$ there are neighbourhoods of zero $V\subseteq A$ and $W\subseteq A$ such that $V \cdot W\subseteq U$ (in other words, this condition means that the multiplication is continuous as a map between topological spaces $A \times A \to A$), or
- stereotype continuity: for each totally bounded set $S\subseteq A$ and for each neighbourhood of zero $U\subseteq A$ there is a neighbourhood of zero $V\subseteq A$ such that $S \cdot V\subseteq U$ and $V \cdot S\subseteq U$, or
- separate continuity: for each element $a\in A$ and for each neighbourhood of zero $U\subseteq A$ there is a neighbourhood of zero $V\subseteq A$ such that $a\cdot V\subseteq U$ and $V\cdot a\subseteq U$.

(Certainly, joint continuity implies stereotype continuity, and stereotype continuity implies separate continuity.) In the first case $A$ is called a "topological algebra with jointly continuous multiplication", and in the last, "with separately continuous multiplication".

A unital associative topological algebra is (sometimes) called a topological ring.

== History ==
The term was coined by David van Dantzig; it appears in the title of his doctoral dissertation (1931).

== Examples ==
1. Fréchet algebras are examples of associative topological algebras with jointly continuous multiplication.
2. Banach algebras are special cases of Fréchet algebras.
3. Stereotype algebras are examples of associative topological algebras with stereotype continuous multiplication.
