= Extra dimensions =

Proposed higher dimensions of space and time

In physics, extra dimensions are proposed additional space or time dimensions beyond the (3 + 1) typical of observed spacetime, such as the first attempts based on the Kaluza–Klein theory. Among theories proposing extra dimensions are:

- Large extra dimension, mostly motivated by the ADD model, by Nima Arkani-Hamed, Savas Dimopoulos, and Gia Dvali in 1998, in an attempt to solve the hierarchy problem. This theory requires that the fields of the Standard Model are confined to a four-dimensional membrane, while gravity propagates in several additional spatial dimensions that are large compared to the Planck scale.
- Warped extra dimensions, such as those proposed by the Randall–Sundrum model (RS), based on warped geometry where the universe is a five-dimensional anti-de Sitter space and the elementary particles except for the graviton are localized on a (3 + 1)-dimensional brane or branes.
- Universal extra dimension, proposed and first studied in 2000, assume, at variance with the ADD and RS approaches, that all fields propagate universally in extra dimensions.
- Dimensional deconstruction is a lattice description of compactified extra dimensions that maintains gauge invariance and allows the discussion of the physics to be based in ordinary 1+3 dimensional space-time.
- Multiple time dimensions, i.e. the possibility that there might be more than one dimension of time, has occasionally been discussed in physics and philosophy, although those models have to deal with the problem of causality.
- As the Lorentz group requires both Euclidean rotations and hyperbolic rotations to describe spacetime symmetry, the eight-dimensional biquaternions have been used to algebraically express both types of rotation.
