= Bimetric gravity =

Proposed theories of gravity

Bimetric gravity or bigravity refers to two different classes of theories. The first class of theories relies on modified mathematical theories of gravity (or gravitation) in which two metric tensors are used instead of one. The second metric may be introduced at high energies, with the implication that the speed of light could be energy-dependent, enabling models with a variable speed of light.

If the two metrics are dynamical and interact, a first possibility implies two graviton modes, one massive and one massless; such bimetric theories are then closely related to massive gravity. Several bimetric theories with massive gravitons exist, such as those attributed to Nathan Rosen (1909–1995) or Mordehai Milgrom with relativistic extensions of Modified Newtonian Dynamics (MOND). More recently, developments in massive gravity have also led to new consistent theories of bimetric gravity. Though none has been shown to account for physical observations more accurately or more consistently than the theory of general relativity, Rosen's theory has been shown to be inconsistent with observations of the Hulse–Taylor binary pulsar. Some of these theories lead to cosmic acceleration at late times and are therefore alternatives to dark energy. Bimetric gravity is also at odds with measurements of gravitational waves emitted by the neutron-star merger GW170817.

On the contrary, the second class of bimetric gravity theories does not rely on massive gravitons and does not modify Newton's law, but instead describes the universe as a manifold having two coupled Riemannian metrics, where matter populating the two sectors interact through gravitation (and antigravitation if the topology and the Newtonian approximation considered introduce negative mass and negative energy states in cosmology as an alternative to dark matter and dark energy). Some of these cosmological models also use a variable speed of light in the high energy density state of the radiation-dominated era of the universe, challenging the inflation hypothesis.

== Rosen's bigravity (1940 to 1989) ==
In general relativity (GR), it is assumed that the distance between two points in spacetime is given by the metric tensor. Einstein's field equation is then used to calculate the form of the metric based on the distribution of energy and momentum.

In 1940, Rosen proposed that at each point of space-time, there is a Euclidean metric tensor $\gamma_{ij}$ in addition to the Riemannian metric tensor $g_{ij}$. Thus at each point of space-time there are two metrics:

1. $ds^{2}=g_{ij}dx^{i}dx^{j}$
2. $d\sigma^{2}=\gamma_{ij} dx^{i} dx^{j}$

The first metric tensor, $g_{ij}$, describes the geometry of space-time and thus the gravitational field. The second metric tensor, $\gamma_{ij}$, refers to the flat space-time and describes the inertial forces. The Christoffel symbols formed from $g_{ij}$ and $\gamma_{ij}$ are denoted by $\{^{i}_{jk}\}$ and $\Gamma^{i}_{jk}$ respectively.

Since the difference of two connections is a tensor, one can define the tensor field $\Delta^{i}_{jk}$ given by:

$\Delta^{i}_{jk}=\{^{i}_{jk}\}-\Gamma^{i}_{jk}$	1

Two kinds of covariant differentiation then arise: $g$-differentiation based on $g_{ij}$ (denoted by a semicolon, e.g. $X_{;a}$), and covariant differentiation based on $\gamma_{ij}$ (denoted by a slash, e.g. $X_{/a}$). Ordinary partial derivatives are represented by a comma (e.g. $X_{,a}$). Let $R^{h}_{ijk}$ and $P^{h}_{ijk}$ be the Riemann curvature tensors calculated from $g_{ij}$ and $\gamma_{ij}$, respectively. In the above approach the curvature tensor $P^{h}_{ijk}$ is zero, since $\gamma_{ij}$ is the flat space-time metric.

A straightforward calculation yields the Riemann curvature tensor

$$\begin{align}R^{h}_{ijk}
&= P^{h}_{ijk}-\Delta^{h}_{ij/k}+\Delta^{h}_{ik/j}+\Delta^{h}_{mj}\Delta^{m}_{ik}-\Delta^{h}_{mk}\Delta^{m}_{ij}\\
&= -\Delta^{h}_{ij/k}+ \Delta^{h}_{ik/j} +\Delta^{h}_{mj}\Delta^{m}_{ik}-\Delta^{h}_{mk}\Delta^{m}_{ij}\end{align}$$

Each term on the right hand side is a tensor. It is seen that from GR one can go to the new formulation just by replacing {:} by $\Delta$ and ordinary differentiation by covariant $\gamma$-differentiation, $\sqrt {-g}$ by $\sqrt{\tfrac{g}{\gamma}}$, integration measure $d^{4}x$ by $\sqrt{-\gamma}\, d^{4}x$, where $g = \det(g_{ij})$, $\gamma = \det(\gamma_{ij})$ and $d^{4}x = dx^{1}dx^{2}dx^{3}dx^{4}$. Having once introduced $\gamma_{ij}$ into the theory, one has a great number of new tensors and scalars at one's disposal. One can set up other field equations other than Einstein's. It is possible that some of these will be more satisfactory for the description of nature.

The geodesic equation in bimetric relativity (BR) takes the form

$\frac{d^2x^{i}}{ds^2} + \Gamma^{i}_{jk} \frac{dx^{j}}{ds} \frac{dx^{k}}{ds} + \Delta^{i}_{jk} \frac{dx^{j}}{ds} \frac{dx^{k}}{ds} = 0$	2

It is seen from equations (1) and (2) that $\Gamma$ can be regarded as describing the inertial field because it vanishes by a suitable coordinate transformation.

Being the quantity $\Delta$ a tensor, it is independent of any coordinate system and hence may be regarded as describing the permanent gravitational field.

Rosen (1973) has found BR satisfying the covariance and equivalence principle. In 1966, Rosen showed that the introduction of the space metric into the framework of general relativity not only enables one to get the energy momentum density tensor of the gravitational field, but also enables one to obtain this tensor from a variational principle. The field equations of BR derived from the variational principle are

$K^{i}_{j} = N^{i}_{j} - \frac{1}{2}\delta^{i}_{j} N = -8 \pi \kappa T^{i}_{j}$	3

where

$$N^{i}_{j} = \frac{1}{2}\gamma^{\alpha \beta}(g^{hi} g_{hj /\alpha})_{/\beta}$$

or

$$\begin{align}
N^{i}_{j} &=\frac{1}{2} \gamma^{\alpha \beta}\left \{ \left (g^{hi}g_{hj, \alpha} \right )_{,\beta } - \left (g^{hi}g_{mj}\Gamma^{m}_{h\alpha} \right )_{,\beta} -\gamma^{\alpha \beta} \left (\Gamma^{i}_{j\alpha} \right )_{,\beta} + \Gamma^{i}_{\lambda \beta} \left [ g^{h\lambda}g_{hj,\alpha} - g^{h\lambda}g_{mj}\Gamma^{m}_{h\alpha}- \Gamma^{\lambda}_{j\alpha} \right ] - \right . \\
&\qquad \Gamma^{\lambda}_{j\beta} \left [ g^{hi} g_{h\lambda,\alpha} - g^{hi} g_{m\lambda} \Gamma^{m}_{h\alpha} -\Gamma^{i}_{\lambda\alpha} \right ]+ \Gamma^{\lambda}_{\alpha \beta} \left. \left [ g^{hi}g_{hj,\lambda} - g^{hi}g_{mj}\Gamma^{m}_{h\lambda} -\Gamma^{i}_{j\lambda} \right ] \right\}
\end{align}$$

with

$N= g^{ij}N_{ij}$, $\kappa = \sqrt{\frac{g}{\gamma}}$

and $T^{i}_{j}$ is the energy-momentum tensor.

The variational principle also leads to the relation

$$T^{i}_{j;i} = 0$$.

Hence from (3)

$$K^{i}_{j;i} = 0$$,

which implies that in a BR, a test particle in a gravitational field moves on a geodesic with respect to $g_{ij}.$

Rosen continued improving his bimetric gravity theory with additional publications in 1978 and 1980, in which he made an attempt "to remove singularities arising in general relativity by modifying it so as to take into account the existence of a fundamental rest frame in the universe." In 1985 Rosen tried again to remove singularities and pseudo-tensors from General Relativity. Twice in 1989 with publications in March and November Rosen further developed his concept of elementary particles in a bimetric field of General Relativity.

It is found that the BR and GR theories differ in the following cases:

- propagation of electromagnetic waves
- the external field of a high density star
- the behaviour of intense gravitational waves propagating through a strong static gravitational field.

The predictions of gravitational radiation in Rosen's theory have been shown since 1992 to be in conflict with observations of the Hulse–Taylor binary pulsar.

== Massive bigravity ==
Since 2010 there has been renewed interest in bigravity after the development by Claudia de Rham, Gregory Gabadadze, and Andrew Tolley (dRGT) of a healthy theory of massive gravity. Massive gravity is a bimetric theory in the sense that nontrivial interaction terms for the metric $g_{\mu\nu}$ can only be written down with the help of a second metric, as the only nonderivative term that can be written using one metric is a cosmological constant. In the dRGT theory, a nondynamical "reference metric" $f_{\mu\nu}$ is introduced, and the interaction terms are built out of the matrix square root of $g^{-1}f$.

In dRGT massive gravity, the reference metric must be specified by hand. One can give the reference metric an Einstein–Hilbert term, in which case $f_{\mu\nu}$ is not chosen but instead evolves dynamically in response to $g_{\mu\nu}$ and possibly matter. This massive bigravity was introduced by Fawad Hassan and Rachel Rosen as an extension of dRGT massive gravity.

The dRGT theory is crucial to developing a theory with two dynamical metrics because general bimetric theories are plagued by the Boulware–Deser ghost, a possible sixth polarization for a massive graviton. The dRGT potential is constructed specifically to render this ghost nondynamical, and as long as the kinetic term for the second metric is of the Einstein–Hilbert form, the resulting theory remains ghost-free.

The action for the ghost-free massive bigravity is given by

$$S = -\frac{M_g^2}{2}\int d^4x \sqrt{-g}R(g )-\frac{M_f^2}{2}\int d^4x \sqrt{-f}R(f) + m^2M_g^2\int d^4x\sqrt{-g}\displaystyle\sum_{n=0}^4\beta_ne_n(\mathbb{X}) + \int d^4x\sqrt{-g}\mathcal{L}_\mathrm{m}(g,\Phi_i).$$

As in standard general relativity, the metric $g_{\mu\nu}$ has an Einstein–Hilbert kinetic term proportional to the Ricci scalar $R(g)$ and a minimal coupling to the matter Lagrangian $\mathcal{L}_\mathrm{m}$, with $\Phi_i$ representing all of the matter fields, such as those of the Standard Model. An Einstein–Hilbert term is also given for $f_{\mu\nu}$. Each metric has its own Planck mass, denoted $M_g$ and $M_f$ respectively. The interaction potential is the same as in dRGT massive gravity. The $\beta_i$ are dimensionless coupling constants and $m$ (or specifically $\beta_i^{1/2}m$) is related to the mass of the massive graviton. This theory propagates seven degrees of freedom, corresponding to a massless graviton and a massive graviton (although the massive and massless states do not align with either of the metrics).

The interaction potential is built out of the elementary symmetric polynomials $e_n$ of the eigenvalues of the matrices $\mathbb K = \mathbb I - \sqrt{g^{-1}f}$ or $\mathbb X = \sqrt{g^{-1}f}$, parametrized by dimensionless coupling constants $\alpha_i$ or $\beta_i$, respectively. Here $\sqrt{g^{-1}f}$ is the matrix square root of the matrix $g^{-1}f$. Written in index notation, $\mathbb X$ is defined by the relation

$$X^\mu{}_\alpha X^\alpha{}_\nu = g^{\mu\alpha}f_{\nu\alpha}.$$

The $e_n$ can be written directly in terms of $\mathbb X$ as

$$\begin{align}
e_0(\mathbb X)&=1,\\
e_1(\mathbb X)&=[\mathbb X], \\
e_2(\mathbb X)&=\frac12\left([\mathbb X]^2-[\mathbb X^2]\right), \\
e_3(\mathbb X)&=\frac16\left([\mathbb X]^3-3[\mathbb X][\mathbb X^2]+2[\mathbb X^3]\right), \\
e_4(\mathbb X)&=\operatorname{det}\mathbb X,
\end{align}$$

where brackets indicate a trace, $[\mathbb X] \equiv X^\mu{}_\mu$. It is the particular antisymmetric combination of terms in each of the $e_n$ which is responsible for rendering the Boulware–Deser ghost nondynamical.

== See also ==
- Alternatives to general relativity
- DGP model
- Scalar–tensor theory
