= Brane cosmology =

Theories in particle physics and cosmology

Brane cosmology refers to several theories in particle physics and cosmology related to string theory, superstring theory and M-theory.

== Brane and bulk ==
Animation showing multiple brane universes in the bulk

The central idea is that the visible, four-dimensional spacetime is restricted to a brane inside a higher-dimensional space, called the "bulk" (also known as "hyperspace"). If the additional dimensions are compact, then the observed universe contains the extra dimension, and then no reference to the bulk is appropriate. In the bulk model, at least some of the extra dimensions are extensive (possibly infinite), and other branes may be moving through this bulk. Interactions with the bulk, and possibly with other branes, can influence our brane and thus introduce effects not seen in more standard cosmological models.

== Why gravity is weak and the cosmological constant is small ==
Some versions of brane cosmology, based on the large extra dimension idea, can explain the weakness of gravity relative to the other fundamental forces of nature, thus solving the hierarchy problem. In the brane picture, the electromagnetic, weak and strong nuclear force are localized on the brane, but gravity has no such constraint and propagates on the full spacetime, called the bulk. Much of the gravitational attractive power "leaks" into the bulk. As a consequence, the force of gravity should appear significantly stronger on small (subatomic or at least sub-millimetre) scales, where less gravitational force has "leaked". In 2004, various experiments were under way to test this. Extensions of the large extra dimension idea with supersymmetry in the bulk appear to be promising in addressing the so-called cosmological constant problem.

== Models of brane cosmology ==
One of the earliest documented attempts to apply brane cosmology as part of a conceptual theory is dated to 1983.

The authors discussed the possibility that the Universe has $(3+N)+1$ dimensions, but ordinary particles are confined in a potential well which is narrow along $N$ spatial directions and flat along three others, and proposed a particular five-dimensional model.

In 1998/99, Merab Gogberashvili published a number of articles on arXiv where he proposes that if we consider the universe as a thin shell (mathematical synonym for "brane") expanding in 5-dimensional space, there is a possibility of obtaining a single scale for particle theory corresponding to the 5-dimensional cosmological constant and the thickness of the universe, thus solving the hierarchy problem. Gogberashvili also showed that the four-dimensionality of the universe is the result of the stability requirement found in mathematics since the extra component of the Einstein field equations giving the confined solution for matter fields coincides with one of the conditions of stability.

In 1999, physicists Lisa Randall and Raman Sundrum proposed the closely related Randall–Sundrum scenarios, RS1 and RS2. (See Randall–Sundrum model for a nontechnical explanation of RS1). These particular models of brane cosmology have attracted a considerable amount of attention. For instance, the related Chung-Freese model, which has applications for spacetime metric engineering, followed in 2000.

Later, the ekpyrotic and cyclic proposals appeared. The ekpyrotic theory hypothesizes that the origin of the observable universe occurred when two parallel branes collided.

== Empirical tests ==
As of now, no experimental or observational evidence of large extra dimensions, as required by the Randall–Sundrum models, has been reported. An analysis of results from the Large Hadron Collider in December 2010 severely constrains the black holes produced in theories with large extra dimensions. The multi-messenger gravitational wave event GW170817 has also been used to put weak limits on large extra dimensions.

== See also ==
- Kaluza–Klein theory
- Loop quantum cosmology
