= Claudia de Rham =

Swiss theoretical physicist (born 1978)

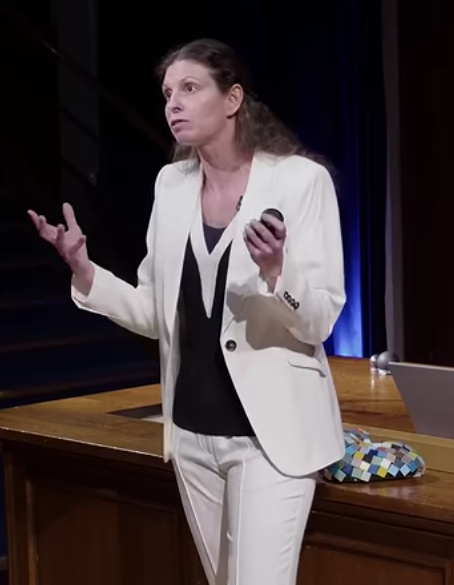
- de Rham in 2026
- Born: 29 March 1978 (age 48)
- Education: École Polytechnique; École Polytechnique Fédérale de Lausanne; University of Cambridge
- Known for: de Rham–Gabadadze–Tolley massive gravity
- Awards: Blavatnik Award (2020); Adams Prize (2018)
- Scientific career
- Doctoral advisor: Anne-Christine Davis

Claudia de Rham (born 29 March 1978) is a Swiss theoretical physicist working at the interface of gravity, cosmology, and particle physics. She is based at Imperial College London. She was one of the UK finalists in the Physical Sciences and Engineering category of the Blavatnik Award for Young Scientists in 2018 for revitalizing the theory of massive gravity and won the award in 2020.

== Early life and education ==
De Rham was born in Lausanne. She completed her undergraduate studies in France, receiving a Diplôme d'Ingénieur in physics at the École Polytechnique in Paris in 2000. She received a master's degree in physics from the École Polytechnique Fédérale de Lausanne in 2001. In 2002, de Rham moved to the UK, achieving a PhD in the Department of Applied Mathematics and Theoretical Physics at the University of Cambridge on "braneworld cosmology beyond the low-energy limit". She has trained as a pilot and made it through several stages of the European Space Agency's astronaut selection process.

== Research ==
After earning her PhD, de Rham went to Montreal to join the physics department at McGill University. She moved to McMaster University in Hamilton and the Perimeter Institute for Theoretical Physics in Waterloo, Ontario, in 2006, where she worked in a joint postdoctoral position in cosmology. In 2010, she joined the University of Geneva as an assistant professor. She moved to Case Western Reserve University in Cleveland, Ohio, in 2011 and became an associate professor there in 2016. She joined Imperial College London in 2016. That year, she was awarded a £100,000 Wolfson Merit Award from the Royal Society.

Her research is in the area of theoretical cosmology, and she explores gravitational models that could explain the accelerated expansion of the universe. De Rham is recognised as a researcher at the forefront of the development of theories of massive gravity, where the particle carrier of the gravitational force, the graviton, may be massive. In 2010, she constructed a nonlinear theory of a massive graviton, which is theoretically consistent and ghost-free. That formulation of massive gravity is now known as "de Rham-Gabadadze-Tolley (dRGT) theory", owing to its discovery by de Rham, Gregory Gabadadze, and Andrew J. Tolley. Her research helps tackle the problem of the cosmological constant and could describe the accelerated expansion of the universe as a purely gravitational effect, where massive gravitons are responsible for dark energy.

In 2015, she gave a TEDx talk titled "Nature of the Graviton". She gives regular public lectures about theoretical cosmology.

De Rham was interviewed by Morgan Freeman in season 8 of Through the Wormhole.

== Publications ==
In November 2023, de Rham co-authored The Encyclopedia of Cosmology, Set 2: Frontiers in Cosmology, Volume 1: Modified Gravity, with Andrew J Tolley, also of Imperial College London. In April 2024, she published The Beauty of Falling: A Life in Pursuit of Gravity.

== Awards and leadership roles ==
- 2010–2014: PI on Swiss National Foundation Professorship Grant, for the project "Challenging the cosmological paradigm"
- 2012–2013: PI on ACES Advance Opportunity Grant, for the project "Recent Developments in Massive Gravity"
- 2016–2021: Royal Society Wolfson Merit Award
- 2017: EPFL Alumni Award
- 2017–2021: PI on Simons Foundation Award, "Origins of the Universe" program with Rachel Rosen
- 2017–2022: PI on ERC consolidator grant, for the project "Massive Gravity and Cosmology"
- 2018: St John's College, Cambridge Adams Prize
- 2018: Blavatnik Award for Young Scientists: finalist, UK Physical Sciences and Engineering
- 2020: Blavatnik Awards for Young Scientists: winner, UK Physical Sciences and Engineering
- 2023: Elected to the American Academy of Arts and Sciences

== See also ==
- Bimetric gravity
