= Vainshtein radius =

Special radius in gravitational physics

Inside the Vainshtein radius

$$r_V = l_\text{P}\left( \frac{m_\text{P}^3M}{m^4_G} \right)^\frac{1}{5}$$
with Planck length $l_\text{P}$ and Planck mass $m_\text{P}$

the gravitational field around a body of mass $M$ is the same in a theory where the graviton mass $m_G$ is zero and where it's very small because the helicity 0 degree of freedom becomes effective on distance scales $r \gg r_V$.

== See also ==
- Massive gravity – Theory of gravity in which the graviton has nonzero mass
