= Rachel Rosen =

American physicist (born 1983)

Rachel A. Rosen
- Born: 31 August 1983 (age 42)
- Education: Brown University; New York University
- Scientific career
- Fields: Theoretical physics
- Doctoral advisor: Gregory Gabadadze

Rachel A. Rosen is a physicist and associate professor of Theoretical Physics at Carnegie Mellon University. Her research involves quantum field theory, cosmology, astrophysics and massive gravity. In particular, she has investigated the problem of the inconsistencies known as "ghosts," and how to formulate models of massive gravity that avoid them.

== Education and career ==
Rosen received her undergraduate degree in mathematics and physics from Brown University. At New York University, she studied the Bullet Cluster with Glennys Farrar and helium-core white dwarfs with the Georgian American scientist Gregory Gabadadze. She received her PhD from that institution in 2009. In 2013, she received a Blavatnik Award for a Young Scientist for work on massive gravity. She is a visiting fellow at the Perimeter Institute for Theoretical Physics.

In July 2017, the Simons Foundation announced that Gabadadze, Rosen and Claudia de Rham would lead a "Cosmology Beyond Einstein's Gravity" research effort as part of the Foundation's new cosmology initiative.

== Select technical publications ==
- Hassan, S. F.; Rosen, Rachel A. (2012-01-24). "Resolving the Ghost Problem in Nonlinear Massive Gravity". Physical Review Letters. 108 (4) 041101. arXiv:1106.3344. Bibcode:2012PhRvL.108d1101H. doi:10.1103/PhysRevLett.108.041101. PMID 22400821. S2CID 17185069.
- Hassan, S. F.; Rosen, Rachel A. (2012-02-01). "Bimetric gravity from ghost-free massive gravity". Journal of High Energy Physics. 2012 (2): 126. arXiv:1109.3515. Bibcode:2012JHEP...02..126H. doi:10.1007/JHEP02(2012)126. ISSN 1029-8479. S2CID 118427524.
- Hassan, S. F.; Rosen, Rachel A. (2012-04-01). "Confirmation of the secondary constraint and absence of ghost in massive gravity and bimetric gravity". Journal of High Energy Physics. 2012 (4): 123. arXiv:1111.2070. Bibcode:2012JHEP...04..123H. doi:10.1007/JHEP04(2012)123. ISSN 1029-8479. S2CID 54517385.
- Hassan, S. F.; Rosen, Rachel A.; Schmidt-May, Angnis (2012-02-01). "Ghost-free massive gravity with a general reference metric". Journal of High Energy Physics. 2012 (2): 26. arXiv:1109.3230. Bibcode:2012JHEP...02..026H. doi:10.1007/JHEP02(2012)026. ISSN 1029-8479. S2CID 119254994.
