= Randall–Sundrum model =

Extra-dimensional model of the universe

In physics, Randall–Sundrum models (RS model; also called 5-dimensional warped geometry theory) are models that describe the world in terms of a warped-geometry higher-dimensional universe, or more concretely as a 5-dimensional anti-de Sitter space where the elementary particles (except the graviton) are localized on a (3 + 1)-dimensional brane or branes.

The two models were proposed in two articles in 1999 by Lisa Randall and Raman Sundrum because they were dissatisfied with the universal extra-dimensional models then in vogue. Such models require two fine tunings; one for the value of the bulk cosmological constant and the other for the brane tensions. Later, while studying RS models in the context of the anti-de Sitter / conformal field theory (AdS/CFT) correspondence, they showed how it can be dual to technicolor models.

The first of the two models, called RS1, has a finite size for the extra dimension with two branes, one at each end. The second, RS2, is similar to the first, but one brane has been placed infinitely far away, so that there is only one brane left in the model.

== Overview ==
The model is a braneworld theory developed while trying to solve the hierarchy problem of the Standard Model. It involves a finite five-dimensional bulk that is extremely warped and contains two branes: the Planckbrane (where gravity is a relatively strong force; also called "Gravitybrane") and the Tevbrane (our home with the Standard Model particles; also called "Weakbrane"). In this model, the two branes are separated in the not-necessarily large fifth dimension by approximately 16 units (the units based on the brane and bulk energies). The Planckbrane has positive brane energy, and the Tevbrane has negative brane energy. These energies are the cause of the extremely warped spacetime.

== Graviton probability function ==
In this warped spacetime that is only warped along the fifth dimension, the graviton's probability function is extremely high at the Planckbrane, but it drops exponentially as it moves closer towards the Tevbrane. In this, gravity would be much weaker on the Tevbrane than on the Planckbrane.

== RS1 model ==
The RS1 model attempts to address the hierarchy problem. The warping of the extra dimension is analogous to the warping of spacetime in the vicinity of a massive object, such as a black hole. This warping, or red-shifting, generates a large ratio of energy scales, so that the natural energy scale at one end of the extra dimension is much larger than at the other end:

$$\mathrm{d}s^2 = \frac{1}{k^2 y^2}(\mathrm{d}y^2 + \eta_{\mu\nu}\,\mathrm{d}x^\mu\,\mathrm{d}x^\nu),$$

where k is some constant, and η has "−+++" metric signature. This space has boundaries at y = 1/k and y = 1/(Wk), with $0 \le 1/k \le 1/(Wk)$, where k is around the Planck scale, W is the warp factor, and Wk is around a TeV. The boundary at y = 1/k is called the Planck brane, and the boundary at y = 1/(Wk) is called the TeV brane. The particles of the Standard Model reside on the TeV brane. The distance between both branes is only −ln(W)/k, though.

In another coordinate system,

$$\varphi\ \stackrel{\mathrm{def}}{=}\ -\frac{\pi \ln(ky)}{\ln(W)},$$

so that

$$0 \le \varphi \le \pi,$$

and

$$\mathrm{d}s^2 = \left(\frac{\ln(W)}{\pi k}\right)^2\, \mathrm{d}\varphi^2 + e^\frac{2\ln(W)\varphi}{\pi} \eta_{\mu\nu}\,\mathrm{d}x^\mu\, \mathrm{d}x^\nu.$$

== RS2 model ==
The RS2 model uses the same geometry as RS1, but there is no TeV brane. The particles of the standard model are presumed to be on the Planck brane. This model was originally of interest because it represented an infinite 5-dimensional model, which, in many respects, behaved as a 4-dimensional model. This setup may also be of interest for studies of the AdS/CFT conjecture.

== Prior models ==
In 1998/99 Merab Gogberashvili published on arXiv a number of articles on a very similar theme. He showed that if the Universe is considered as a thin shell (a mathematical synonym for "brane") expanding in 5-dimensional space, then there is a possibility to obtain one scale for particle theory corresponding to the 5-dimensional cosmological constant and Universe thickness, and thus to solve the hierarchy problem. It was also shown that four-dimensionality of the Universe is the result of stability requirement, since the extra component of the Einstein field equations giving the localized solution for matter fields coincides with one of the conditions of stability.

== Experimental results ==
In August 2016, experimental results from the LHC excluded RS gravitons with masses below 3.85 and 4.45 TeV for ˜k = 0.1 and 0.2 respectively and for ˜k = 0.01, graviton masses below 1.95 TeV, except for the region between 1.75 TeV and 1.85 TeV. Currently, these are the most stringent limits on RS graviton production.

== See also ==
- ADD model
- DGP model
- Goldberger–Wise mechanism
- Kaluza–Klein theory
- Scientific importance of GW170817, a neutron star merger

== Sources ==
- Randall, Lisa (2005). Warped Passages: Unraveling the Mysteries of the Universe's Hidden Dimensions. New York: HarperCollins. ISBN 978-0-06-053108-9.
