= Massive gravity =

Theory of gravity in which the graviton has nonzero mass

In theoretical physics, massive gravity is a theory of gravity that modifies general relativity by endowing the graviton with a nonzero mass. In the classical theory, this means that gravitational waves obey a massive wave equation and hence travel at speeds below the speed of light.

== Background ==
Massive gravity has a long and winding history, dating back to the 1930s when Wolfgang Pauli and Markus Fierz first developed a theory of a massive spin-2 field propagating on a flat spacetime background. It was later realized in the 1970s that theories of a massive graviton suffered from dangerous pathologies, including a ghost mode and a discontinuity with general relativity in the limit where the graviton mass goes to zero. While solutions to these problems had existed for some time in three spacetime dimensions, they were not solved in four dimensions and higher until the work of Claudia de Rham, Gregory Gabadadze, and Andrew Tolley (dRGT model) in 2010.

One of the very early massive gravity theories was constructed in 1965 by Ogievetsky and Polubarinov (OP). Despite the fact that the OP model coincides with the ghost-free massive gravity models rediscovered in dRGT, the OP model has been almost unknown among contemporary physicists who work on massive gravity, perhaps because the strategy followed in that model was quite different from what is generally adopted at present. Massive dual gravity to the OP model can be obtained by coupling the dual graviton field to the curl of its own energy-momentum tensor. Since the mixed symmetric field strength of dual gravity is comparable to the totally symmetric extrinsic curvature tensor of the Galileons theory, the effective Lagrangian of the dual model in 4-D can be obtained from the Faddeev–LeVerrier recursion, which is similar to that of Galileon theory up to the terms containing polynomials of the trace of the field strength. This is also manifested in the dual formulation of Galileon theory.

That general relativity is modified at large distances in massive gravity provides a possible explanation for the accelerated expansion of the Universe that does not require any dark energy. Massive gravity and its extensions, such as bimetric gravity, can yield cosmological solutions which do in fact display late-time acceleration in agreement with observations.

Observations of gravitational waves have constrained the Compton wavelength of the graviton to be λ_{g} > 1.6×10^{16} m, which can be interpreted as a bound on the graviton mass m_{g} < 7.7×10^{−23} eV/c^{2}. Competitive bounds on the mass of the graviton have also been obtained from solar system measurements by space missions such as Cassini and MESSENGER, which instead give the constraint λ_{g} > 1.83×10^{16} m or m_{g} < 6.76×10^{−23} eV/c^{2}.

== Linearized massive gravity ==
At the linear level, one can construct a theory of a massive spin-2 field $h_{\mu\nu}$ propagating on Minkowski space. This can be seen as an extension of linearized gravity in the following way. Linearized gravity is obtained by linearizing general relativity around flat space, $g_{\mu\nu} = \eta_{\mu\nu} + M_\mathsf{Pl}^{-1}h_{\mu\nu}$, where $M_\mathsf{Pl} = 1 / \sqrt{ 8\pi G\ }$ is the Planck mass with $G$ the Newtonian constant of gravitation. This leads to a kinetic term in the Lagrangian for $h_{\mu\nu}$ that is consistent with diffeomorphism invariance, as well as a coupling to matter of the form

$$h^{\mu\nu}T_{\mu\nu}\ ,$$

where $T_{\mu\nu}$ is the stress–energy tensor. This kinetic term and matter coupling combined are nothing other than the Einstein–Hilbert action linearized about flat space.

Massive gravity is obtained by adding nonderivative interaction terms for $h_{\mu\nu}$. At the linear level (i.e., second order in $h_{\mu\nu}$), there are only two possible mass terms:

$$\mathcal{L}_\mathrm{int} = a\ h^{\mu\nu}h_{\mu\nu} + b\ \left( \eta^{\mu\nu}h_{\mu\nu} \right)^2 ~.$$

Fierz and Pauli showed in 1939 that this only propagates the expected five polarizations of a massive graviton (as compared to two for the massless case) if the coefficients are chosen so that $a = -b$. Any other choice will unlock a sixth, "ghostly" degree of freedom. A "ghost" is a mode with a negative kinetic energy; that leads to logical contradictions in the theory. Its Hamiltonian is unbounded from below and it is therefore unstable to decay into particles of arbitrarily large positive and negative energies. The Fierz–Pauli mass term,

$$\mathcal{L}_\mathrm{FP} = m^2\left(h^{\mu\nu}h_{\mu\nu} - \left(\eta^{\mu\nu}h_{\mu\nu}\right)^2 \right)$$

is therefore the unique consistent linear theory of a massive spin-2 field.

== vDVZ discontinuity ==
In the 1970s Hendrik van Dam and Martinus J. G. Veltman and, independently, Valentin I. Zakharov discovered a peculiar property of Fierz–Pauli massive gravity: its predictions do not uniformly reduce to those of general relativity in the limit $m\to0$. In particular, while at small scales (shorter than the Compton wavelength of the graviton mass), Newton's gravitational law is recovered, the bending of light is only three quarters of the result Albert Einstein obtained in general relativity. This is known as the vDVZ discontinuity.

We may understand the smaller light bending as follows. The Fierz–Pauli massive graviton, due to the broken diffeomorphism invariance, propagates three extra degrees of freedom compared to the massless graviton of linearized general relativity. These three degrees of freedom package themselves into a vector field, which is irrelevant for our purposes, and a scalar field. This scalar mode exerts an extra attraction in the massive case compared to the massless case. Hence, if one wants measurements of the force exerted between nonrelativistic masses to agree, the coupling constant of the massive theory should be smaller than that of the massless theory. But light bending is blind to the scalar sector, because the stress–energy tensor of light is traceless. Hence, provided the two theories agree on the force between nonrelativistic probes, the massive theory would predict a smaller light bending than the massless one.

== Vainshtein screening ==
It was argued by Vainshtein two years later that the vDVZ discontinuity is an artifact of the linear theory, and that the predictions of general relativity are in fact recovered at small scales when one takes into account nonlinear effects, i.e., higher than quadratic terms in $h_{\mu\nu}$. Heuristically speaking, within a region known as the Vainshtein radius, fluctuations of the scalar mode become nonlinear, and its higher-order derivative terms become larger than the canonical kinetic term. Canonically normalizing the scalar around this background therefore leads to a heavily suppressed kinetic term, which damps fluctuations of the scalar within the Vainshtein radius. Because the extra force mediated by the scalar is proportional to (minus) its gradient, this leads to a much smaller extra force than we would have calculated just using the linear Fierz–Pauli theory.

This phenomenon, known as Vainshtein screening, is at play not just in massive gravity, but also in related theories of modified gravity such as DGP and certain scalar-tensor theories, where it is crucial for hiding the effects of modified gravity in the solar system. This allows these theories to match terrestrial and solar-system tests of gravity as well as general relativity does, while maintaining large deviations at larger distances. In this way these theories can lead to cosmic acceleration and have observable imprints on the large-scale structure of the Universe without running afoul of other, much more stringent constraints from observations closer to home.

== Boulware–Deser ghost ==
As a response to Freund–Maheshwari–Schonberg finite-range gravity model, and around the same time as the vDVZ discontinuity and Vainshtein mechanism were discovered, David Boulware and Stanley Deser found in 1972 that generic nonlinear extensions of the Fierz–Pauli theory reintroduced the dangerous ghost mode; the tuning $a=-b$ which ensured this mode's absence at quadratic order was, they found, generally broken at cubic and higher orders, reintroducing the ghost at those orders. As a result, this Boulware–Deser ghost would be present around, for example, highly inhomogeneous backgrounds.

This is problematic because a linearized theory of gravity, like Fierz–Pauli, is well-defined on its own but cannot interact with matter, as the coupling $h^{\mu\nu}T_{\mu\nu}$ breaks diffeomorphism invariance. This must be remedied by adding new terms at higher and higher orders, ad infinitum. For a massless graviton, this process converges and the result is well-known: one simply arrives at general relativity. This is the meaning of the statement that general relativity is the unique theory (up to conditions on dimensionality, locality, etc.) of a massless spin-2 field.

In order for massive gravity to actually describe gravity, i.e., a massive spin-2 field coupling to matter and thereby mediating the gravitational force, a nonlinear completion must similarly be obtained. The Boulware–Deser ghost presents a serious obstacle to such an endeavor. The vast majority of theories of massive and interacting spin-2 fields will suffer from this ghost and therefore not be viable. In fact, until 2010 it was widely believed that all Lorentz-invariant massive gravity theories possessed the Boulware–Deser ghost despite endeavors to prove that such belief is invalid. It is worth noting that the dRGT model is the best way to single out and "bust" the BD ghost since both are developed using Hamiltonian treatments and ADM variables. But for the finite-range gravity model and Ogievetsky and Polubarinov model, it turns out that they need Noether's variational principle together with redefining and conformally improving the energy momentum tensor as a source field.

== Ghost-free massive gravity ==
In 2010 a breakthrough was achieved when de Rham, Gabadadze, and Tolley constructed, order by order, a theory of massive gravity with coefficients tuned to avoid the Boulware–Deser ghost by packaging all ghostly (i.e., higher-derivative) operators into total derivatives which do not contribute to the equations of motion. The complete absence of the Boulware–Deser ghost, to all orders and beyond the decoupling limit, was subsequently proven by Fawad Hassan and Rachel Rosen.

The action for the ghost-free de Rham–Gabadadze–Tolley (dRGT) massive gravity is given by

$$S=\int d^4x \sqrt{-g \;~}\ \left(-\frac{\ M_\mathsf{Pl}^2 }{ 2 }\ R + m^2\ M_\mathsf{Pl}^2\ \sum_{n=0}^4\alpha_n\ e_n\!\left( \mathbb{K} \right) + \mathcal{L}_\mathsf{m}\!\left( g, \Phi_i \right) \right)\ ,$$

or, equivalently,

$$S = \int d^4x\ \sqrt{-g\;}\ \left( -\frac{\ M_\mathsf{Pl}^2 }{2}\ R + m^2\ M_\mathsf{Pl}^2\ \sum_{n=0}^4\beta_n\ e_n\!\left( \mathbb{X} \right) + \mathcal{L}_\mathsf{m}\!\left( g, \Phi_i\right) \right) ~.$$

The ingredients require some explanation. As in standard general relativity, there is an Einstein–Hilbert kinetic term proportional to the Ricci scalar $R$ and a minimal coupling to the matter Lagrangian $\mathcal{L}_\mathsf{m}$, with $\Phi_i$ representing all of the matter fields, such as those of the Standard Model. The new piece is a mass term, or interaction potential, constructed carefully to avoid the Boulware–Deser ghost, with an interaction strength $m$ which is (if the nonzero $\beta_i$ are $\mathcal{O}(1)$) closely related to the mass of the graviton.

The principle of gauge-invariance renders redundant expressions in any field theory provided with its corresponding gauge(s). For example, in the massive spin-1 Proca action, the massive part in the Lagrangian $\tfrac{1}{2} m A_{\mu} A^{\mu}$ breaks the $\mathrm{U}(1)$ gauge-invariance. However, the invariance is restored by introducing the transformations: $A_{\mu} \to A_{\mu} + \partial_{\mu}\pi$. The same can be done for massive gravity by following Arkani-Hamed, Georgi and Schwartz effective field theory for massive gravity. The absence of vDVZ discontinuity in this approach motivated the development of dRGT resummation of massive gravity theory as follows.

The interaction potential is built out of the elementary symmetric polynomials $e_n$ of the eigenvalues of the matrices $\textstyle \mathbb{K} = \mathbb I - \sqrt{g^{-1} f ~}$ or $\textstyle \mathbb X = \sqrt{g^{-1} f ~}$ parametrized by dimensionless coupling constants $\alpha_i$ or $\beta_i$, respectively. Here $\textstyle \sqrt{g^{-1} f ~}$ is the matrix square root of the matrix $g^{-1}f$. Written in index notation, $\mathbb X$ is defined by the relation $X^\mu{}_\alpha X^\alpha{}_\nu = g^{\mu\alpha} f_{\nu\alpha}$. We have introduced a reference metric $f_{\mu\nu}$ in order to construct the interaction term. There is a simple reason for this: it is impossible to construct a nontrivial interaction (i.e., nonderivative) term from $g_{\mu\nu}$ alone. The only possibilities are $g^{\mu\alpha}g_{\alpha\nu} = \delta^\mu_\nu$ and $\det g$, both of which lead to a cosmological constant term rather than a bona fide interaction. Physically, $f_{\mu\nu}$ corresponds to the background metric around which fluctuations take the Fierz–Pauli form. This means that, for instance, nonlinearly completing the Fierz–Pauli theory around Minkowski space given above will lead to dRGT massive gravity with $f_{\mu\nu} = \eta_{\mu\nu}$, although the proof of absence of the Boulware–Deser ghost holds for general $f_{\mu\nu}$.

The reference metric transforms like a metric tensor under diffeomorphism

$$f_{\mu\nu} \to f'_{\mu\nu}\!\left(\ X(x)\ \right) \equiv f_{\alpha\beta}\ \partial_{\mu}X^{\alpha}\ \partial_{\nu}X^{\beta}~.$$

Therefore $\ \left[\ \mathbb{X}^2\ \right] = X^\mu{}_\alpha\ X^\alpha{}_\mu = g^{\mu\alpha}\ f_{\mu\alpha}\ ,$ and similar terms with higher powers, transforms as a scalar under the same diffeomorphism. For a change in the coordinates $x_{\mu}\to x_{\mu}+\xi_{\mu}$, we expand $\ X^{\mu} = x^{\mu} - \phi^{\mu}\$ with $\ f_{\mu\nu}=\eta_{\mu\nu}\$ such that the perturbed metric becomes:

$$h_{\mu\nu} \to h'_{\mu\nu} = h_{\mu\nu} + \partial_{\mu}\phi_{\nu} + \partial_{\nu}\phi_{\mu} - \partial_{\mu}\phi^{\alpha}\ \partial_{\nu}\phi_{\alpha}\ ,$$

while the potential-like vector transforms according to Stueckelberg trick as $\phi_{\mu} \to \phi_{\mu} + \xi_{\mu}$ such that the Stueckelberg field is defined as $\phi^{\mu} = \eta^{\mu\nu} \left(A_{\nu} - \partial_{\nu}\pi\right)$. From the diffeomorphism, one can define another Stueckelberg matrix $\mathbb{Y}^a_{~b} \equiv f_{bc} g^{\mu\nu} \partial_{\mu} X^a \partial_{\nu}X^c$, where $\mathbb{Y}^a_{~b}$ and $\mathbb{X}^a_{~b}$ have the same eigenvalues. Now, one considers the following symmetries:

$$\begin{align}
\delta h_{\mu\nu} & = \partial_{\mu} \xi_{\nu} + \partial_{\nu} \xi_{\mu} + \frac{2}{\ M_{\mathsf{Pl}}\ }\ \mathcal{L}_{\xi}\ h_{\mu\nu} \\
\delta A_{\mu} & = \partial_{\mu}\pi - m\ \xi_{\mu} + \frac{2}{\ M_{\mathsf{Pl}}\ }\ \xi^{\alpha}\partial_{\alpha} A_{\mu} \\
\delta \pi & = - m\ \pi
\end{align}$$

such that the transformed perturbed metric becomes:

$$h'_{\mu\nu} = h_{\mu\nu} + \partial_{\mu} A_{\nu} + \partial_{\nu} A_{\mu} - \partial_{\mu} A^{\alpha}\ \partial_{\nu} A_{\alpha} - \partial_{\mu} A^{\alpha}\ \partial_{\nu} \partial_{\alpha} \pi - \partial_{\mu}\partial_{\alpha} \pi\ \partial_{\nu} A^{\alpha} - 2\ \partial_{\mu} \partial_{\nu} \pi -\partial_{\mu} \partial_{\alpha} \pi\ \partial_{\nu} \partial^{\alpha}\ \pi ~.$$

The covariant form of these transformations are obtained as follows. If helicity-0 (or spin-0) mode $\pi$ is a pure gauge of unphysical Goldstone modes, with $\Pi_{\mu\nu} = \nabla_{\mu} \nabla_{\nu} \pi$, the matrix $\ \mathbb{X}\$ is a tensor function of the covariantization tensor

$$H_{\mu\nu} = \eta_{\mu\nu} + 2\Pi_{\mu\nu} - \eta^{\alpha\beta} \Pi_{\mu\alpha} \Pi_{\beta\nu} = \eta_{\mu\nu} + h_{\mu\nu} - \eta_{ab} \nabla_{\mu} \phi^a \nabla_{\nu} \phi^b$$

of the metric perturbation $h_{\mu\nu}$ such that tensor $H_{\mu\nu}$ is Stueckelbergized by the field $\phi^a = A^a - \eta^{a\mu} \nabla_{\mu} \pi$. Helicity-0 mode transforms under Galilean transformations $\pi \to \pi + c + v_{\mu}\ x^{\mu}$, hence the name "Galileons". The matrix $\mathbb{X}$ is a tensor function of the covariantization tensor $H_{\mu\nu} \equiv g_{\mu\nu} - f'_{\mu\nu}$ of the metric perturbation $h_{\mu\nu}$ with components are given by:

$$\mathbb{X}_{\mu\nu} = \eta_{\mu\nu} + 2\ \mathcal{K}_{\mu\nu} - \eta^{\alpha\beta}\ \mathcal{K}_{\mu\alpha} \mathcal{K}_{\beta\nu}\ ,$$

where

$$\mathcal{K}_{\mu\nu} = \eta_{\mu\nu} - \left( \sqrt{\mathbb{X} \;~} \right)_{\mu \nu } = \eta_{\mu\nu} - \sqrt{\ \eta_{\mu\nu} - H_{\mu\nu} \;~}$$

is the extrinsic curvature.

Interestingly, the covariantization tensor was originally introduced by Maheshwari in a solo authored paper sequel to helicity-$(2 \oplus 0)$ Freund–Maheshwari–Schonberg finite-range gravitation model. In Maheshwari's work, the metric perturbation obeys Hilbert–Lorentz condition $m^2 \left( \partial_{\nu} h_{\mu\nu} + q\ \partial_{\mu} h \right) = 0$ under the variation

$$\delta^{*} h_{\mu\nu} = \delta h_{\mu\nu} + \delta h^\mathsf{spin}_{\mu\nu} = \partial_{\mu} \xi_{\nu} + \partial_{\nu} \xi_{\mu} + p\ \eta_{\mu\nu}\ h + \delta h^\mathsf{spin}_{\mu\nu}$$

that is introduced in Ogievetsky–Polubarinov massive gravity, where $p$ and $q$ are to be determined. It is easy to notice the similarity between tensor $\mathbb{X}$ in dRGT and the tensor $h_{(p)}^{\mu\nu} = (\eta^{\mu\nu} - n\ \psi^{\mu\nu})^{\tfrac{1}{n}}$ in Maheshwari work once $n=2$ is chosen. Also Ogievetsky–Polubarinov model mandates $n = -\tfrac{ 1 }{p}$, which means that in 4D, $p = -\tfrac{\ 1\ }{n} = -\tfrac{\ 1\ }{2}$, the variation $\delta h_{\mu\nu}$ is conformal.

The dRGT massive fields split into two helicity-2 $h_{\mu\nu}$, two helicity-1 $A_{\mu}$ and one helicity-0 $\pi$ degrees of freedom, just like those of Fierz-Pauli massive theory. However, the covariantization, together with the decoupling limit, guarantee that the symmetries of this massive theory are reduced to the symmetry of linearized general relativity plus that of $\mathrm{U}(1)$ massive theory, while the scalar decouples. If $v_{\mu}$ is chosen to be divergenceless, i.e. $\Box\ \pi = 0$, the decoupling limit of dRGT gives the known linearized gravity. To see how that happens, expand the terms containing $\mathcal{K}_{\mu\nu}$ in the action in powers of $H_{\mu\nu}$, where $H_{\mu\nu}$ is expressed in terms of $\phi^{a}$ fields like how $h'_{\mu\nu}$ is expressed in terms of $A^{\mu}$. The fields $h_{\mu\nu}, A_{\mu}, \pi$ are replaced by:

$$\begin{align}
\tilde{h}_{\mu\nu} & = M_{\mathsf{Pl}}\ h_{\mu\nu} \\
\tilde{A}_{\mu}    & = M_{\mathsf{Pl}}\ m\ A_{\mu} \\
\tilde{\pi}        & = M_{\mathsf{Pl}}\ m^2\ \pi \\
\hat{h}_{\mu\nu}   & = \tilde{h}_{\mu\nu} - \eta_{\mu\nu}\tilde{\pi}
\end{align}$$

Then it follows that in the decoupling limit, i.e. when both $M_{\mathsf{Pl} } \to \infty, m \to 0, m^2 M_{\mathsf{Pl} } = \text{const}$, the massive gravity Lagrangian is invariant under:

1. $\delta h_{\mu\nu} = \partial_{\mu} \xi_{\nu} + \partial_{\nu} \xi_{\mu} ,$ as in Linearized general theory of relativity,
2. $\delta A_{\mu} = \partial_{\mu} \pi ,$ as in Maxwell's electromagnetic theory, and
3. $\delta\pi = 0 .$

In principle, the reference metric must be specified by hand, and therefore there is no single dRGT massive gravity theory, as the theory with a flat reference metric is different from one with a de Sitter reference metric, etc. Alternatively, one can think of $f_{\mu\nu}$ as a constant of the theory, much like $m$ or $M_\mathsf{Pl}$. Instead of specifying a reference metric from the start, one can allow it to have its own dynamics. If the kinetic term for $f_{\mu\nu}$ is also Einstein–Hilbert, then the theory remains ghost-free and we are left with a theory of massive bigravity, (or bimetric relativity, BR) propagating the two degrees of freedom of a massless graviton in addition to the five of a massive one.

In practice it is unnecessary to compute the eigenvalues of $\mathbb X$ (or $\mathbb K$) in order to obtain the $e_n$. They can be written directly in terms of $\mathbb X$ as

$$\begin{align}
e_0\!\left( \mathbb X \right) & = 1\ , \\
e_1\!\left( \mathbb X \right) & = \left[\ \mathbb X \right]\ , \\
e_2\!\left( \mathbb X \right) & = \tfrac{\ 1\ }{2} \left( \left[\ \mathbb X\ \right]^2 - \left[\ \mathbb X^2\ \right] \right)\ , \\
e_3\!\left( \mathbb X \right) & = \tfrac{\ 1\ }{6} \left( \left[\ \mathbb X\ \right]^3 - 3\ \left[\ \mathbb X\ \right] \left[\ \mathbb X^2\ \right] + 2\ \left[\ \mathbb X^3\ \right] \right)\ , \\
e_4\!\left(\mathbb X \right) & = \det \mathbb X\ ,
\end{align}$$

where brackets indicate a trace, $[\ \mathbb X\ ] \equiv X^\mu{}_\mu \equiv \operatorname{tr} \mathbb X ~.$ It is the particular antisymmetric combination of terms in each of the $e_n$ which is responsible for rendering the Boulware–Deser ghost nondynamical.

The choice to use $\ \mathbb X\$ or $\mathbb K = \mathbb I - \mathbb X$, with $\mathbb I$ the identity matrix, is a convention, as in both cases the ghost-free mass term is a linear combination of the elementary symmetric polynomials of the chosen matrix. One can transform from one basis to the other, in which case the coefficients satisfy the relationship

$$\beta_n = (4-n)!\ \sum_{i=n}^4\ \frac{\ (-1)^{i+n}\ }{\ (4-i)!(i-n)!\ }\ \alpha_i ~.$$

The coefficients are of a characteristic polynomial that is in form of Fredholm determinant. They can also be obtained using Faddeev–LeVerrier algorithm.

== Massive gravity in the vierbein language ==
In a 4D orthonormal tetrad frame, we have the bases:

$$\begin{align}
e^0_{\,\mu}&=(-1,0,0,0)\\
e^I_{\,\mu}&=(0,e^I_i)
\end{align}$$

where the index $i$ is for the 3D spatial component of the $\mu$-non-orthonormal coordinates, and the index $I$ is for the 3D spatial components of the $a$-orthonormal ones. The parallel transport requires the spin connection $e^{0\nu}\nabla_{e^{0\nu} }e^I_{~\mu}=0$. Therefore, the extrinsic curvature, that corresponds to $\mathcal{K}_{\mu\nu}$ in metric formalism, becomes

$$K^i_j\equiv\frac{1}{2}\gamma^{ik}\partial_t(\gamma_{kj})=e^i_I\partial_t(e^I_j),$$

where $\gamma_{ij}$ is the spatial metric as in the ADM formalism and initial value formulation.

If the tetrad conformally transforms as $e^I_i\to {e'}^I_i\equiv a(t)~e^I_i,$ the extrinsic curvature becomes ${K'}^i_j = \frac{a}{\dot{a}} K^i_j = \delta^i_j - \frac{a}{\dot{a}} e^i_I\partial_t \!\! \left(e^I_j\right)$, where from Friedmann equations $\frac{a}{\dot{a}}=\frac{a}{\partial_t a}\sim\frac{1}{\sqrt\Lambda}$, and $m\sim 1/\sqrt\Lambda$ (despite it is controversial), i.e. the extrinsic curvature transforms as $K^i_j\to mK^i_j=\delta^i_j-m~e^i_I\dot{e}^I_j$. This looks very similar to the matrix $\mathbb{K}$ or the tensor $\mathcal{K}^i_j$.

The dRGT was developed inspired by applying the previous technique to the 5D DGP model after considering the deconstruction of higher dimensional Kaluza–Klein gravity theories, in which the extra dimension(s) are replaced by series of N lattice sites such that the higher dimensional metric is replaced by a set of interacting metrics that depend only on the 4D components.

The presence of a square-root matrix is somewhat awkward and points to an alternative, simpler formulation in terms of vierbeins. Splitting the metrics into vierbeins as

$$\begin{align}
g_{\mu\nu} &= \eta_{ab}e^a{}_\mu e^b{}_\nu \\
f_{\mu\nu} &= \eta_{ab}f^a{}_\mu f^b{}_\nu
\end{align}$$

and then defining one-forms

$$\begin{align}
\mathbf{e}^a &= e^a{}_\mu dx^\mu\\
\mathbf{f}^a &= f^a{}_\mu dx^\mu\\
\mathbf{i}^a &= \delta^a{}_\mu dx^\mu,
\end{align}$$

the ghost-free interaction terms in Hassan-Rosen bigravity theory can be written simply as (up to numerical factors)

$$\begin{align}
e_0(\mathbb X) \propto \epsilon_{abcd}\mathbf{e}^a\wedge \mathbf{e}^b\wedge \mathbf{e}^c\wedge \mathbf{e}^d\\
e_1(\mathbb X) \propto \epsilon_{abcd}\mathbf{e}^a\wedge \mathbf{e}^b\wedge \mathbf{e}^c\wedge \mathbf{f}^d\\
e_2(\mathbb X) \propto \epsilon_{abcd}\mathbf{e}^a\wedge \mathbf{e}^b\wedge \mathbf{f}^c\wedge \mathbf{f}^d\\
e_3(\mathbb X) \propto \epsilon_{abcd}\mathbf{e}^a\wedge \mathbf{f}^b\wedge \mathbf{f}^c\wedge \mathbf{f}^d\\
e_4(\mathbb X) \propto \epsilon_{abcd}\mathbf{f}^a\wedge \mathbf{f}^b\wedge \mathbf{f}^c\wedge \mathbf{f}^d
\end{align}$$

In terms of vierbeins, rather than metrics, we can therefore see the physical significance of the ghost-free dRGT potential terms quite clearly: they are simply all the different possible combinations of wedge products of the vierbeins of the two metrics.

Note that massive gravity in the metric and vierbein formulations are only equivalent if the symmetry condition

$$(e^{-1})_a{}^\mu f_{b\nu} = (e^{-1})_b{}^\mu f_{a\nu}$$

is satisfied. While this is true for most physical situations, there may be cases, such as when matter couples to both metrics or in multimetric theories with interaction cycles, in which it is not. In these cases the metric and vierbein formulations are distinct physical theories, although each propagates a healthy massive graviton.

The novelty in dRGT massive gravity is that it is a theory of gauge invariance under both local Lorentz transformations, from assuming the reference metric $f_{\mu\nu}$ equals the Minkowski metric $\eta_{\mu\nu}$, and diffeomorphism invariance, from the existence of the active curved spacetime $g_{\mu\nu}$. This is shown by rewriting the previously discussed Stueckelberg formalism in the vierbein language as follows.

The 4D version of Einstein field equations in 5D is read

$$G_{\mu\nu}n^\mu n^\nu = \frac{1}{2} \left( R - K^{\mu\nu} K_{\mu\nu} + \left(K^{\mu}_{~\mu}\right)^2 \right),$$

where $n^\mu$ is the vector normal to the 4D slice. Using the definition of massive extrinsic curvature $mK^i_j=\delta^i_j-m~e^i_I\dot{e}^I_j$, it is straightforward to see that terms containing extrinsic curvatures take the functional form $(f^a-e^a)\wedge(f^b-e^b)\wedge e^c \wedge e^d$ in the tetradic action.

Therefore, up to the numerical coefficients, the full dRGT action in its tensorial form is

$$S = \frac{M^2_{\text{Pl}}}{2} \int dx^4 \sqrt{g}\left(R+2m^2[e_2(\mathcal{K})+e_3(\mathcal{K})+e_4(\mathcal{K})]\right),$$

where the functions $e_i(\mathcal{K})$ take forms similar to that of the $e_i(\mathbb{X})$. Then, up to some numerical coefficients, the action takes the integral form

$$S = \frac{M^2_{\text{Pl}}}{2} \epsilon_{abcd} \int \Big(\mathbf{e}^a \land \mathbf{e}^b \land R^{cd}-m^2 \left[ \mathbf{e}^a \land \mathbf{e}^b \land \mathbf{e}^c \land \mathbf{e}^d + \mathbf{i}^a \land \mathbf{e}^b\land\mathbf{e}^c\land\mathbf{e}^d+\mathbf{i}^a \land \mathbf{i}^b \land \mathbf{e}^c \land \mathbf{e}^d + \mathbf{i}^a \land \mathbf{i}^b \land \mathbf{i}^c \land \mathbf{e}^d \right]\Big),$$

where the first term is the Einstein-Hilbert part of the tetradic Palatini action and $\epsilon_{abcd}$ is the Levi-Civita symbol.

As the decoupling limit guarantees that $\Box\pi=0$ and $A_{\mu}\to x_{\mu}$ by comparing $X^{\mu}$ to {{tmath \phi^{\mu} }}, it is legit to think of the tensor ${{{1}}}$. Comparing this with the definition of the 1-form $\mathbf{i}^a$, one can define covariant components of frame field $f^a{}_{\mu}=\partial_{\mu}\phi^{\nu}\delta^a_{~\nu}$, i.e. $e^a{}_{\mu}=\frac{\partial x^{\nu} }{\partial\phi^{\mu} } \Lambda^a{}_{b} e^b{}_{\nu}$, to replace the $\mathbf{i}^a$ such that the last three interaction terms in the vierbein action becomes

$$S = -\frac{M^2_{\text{Pl}}}{2} m^2\epsilon_{abcd} \int \left[
\mathbf{f}^a \land \left(\Lambda^{b}_{b'}\mathbf{e}^{b'}\right) \land \left(\Lambda^{c}_{c'}\mathbf{e}^{c'}\right) \land \left(\Lambda^{d}_{d'}\mathbf{e}^{d'}\right)
+ \mathbf{f}^a \land \mathbf{f}^b  \land \left(\Lambda^{c}_{c'}\mathbf{e}^{c'}\right)\land \left(\Lambda^{d}_{d'}\mathbf{e}^{d'}\right)
+ \mathbf{f}^a \land \mathbf{f}^b\land \mathbf{f}^c \land \left(\Lambda^{d}_{d'}\mathbf{e}^{d'}\right)
\right].$$

This can be done because one is allowed to freely move the diffeomorphism transformations $\partial_{\nu}\phi^{\mu}$ onto the reference vierbein through the Lorentz transformations $\Lambda^a{}_{b}$. More importantly, the diffeomorphism transformations help manifesting the dynamics of the helicity-0 and helicity-1 modes, hence the easiness of gauging them away when the theory is compared with its version with the only $U(1)$ gauge transformations while the Stueckelberg fields are turned off.

One may wonder why the coefficients are dropped, and how to guarantee they are numerical with no explicit dependence of the fields. In fact this is allowed because the variation of the vierbein action with respect to the locally Lorentz transformed Stueckelberg fields yields this nice result. Moreover, we can solve explicitly for the Lorentz invariant Stueckelberg fields, and on substituting back into the vierbein action we can show full equivalence with the tensorial form of dRGT massive gravity.

== Cosmology ==
If the graviton mass $m$ is comparable to the Hubble rate $H_0$, then at cosmological distances the mass term can produce a repulsive gravitational effect that leads to cosmic acceleration. Because, roughly speaking, the enhanced diffeomorphism symmetry in the limit $m=0$ protects a small graviton mass from large quantum corrections, the choice $m\sim H_0$ is in fact technically natural. Massive gravity thus may provide a solution to the cosmological constant problem: why do quantum corrections not cause the Universe to accelerate at extremely early times?

However, it turns out that flat and closed Friedmann–Lemaître–Robertson–Walker cosmological solutions do not exist in dRGT massive gravity with a flat reference metric. Open solutions and solutions with general reference metrics suffer from instabilities. Therefore, viable cosmologies can only be found in massive gravity if one abandons the cosmological principle that the Universe is uniform on large scales, or otherwise generalizes dRGT. For instance, cosmological solutions are better behaved in bigravity, the theory which extends dRGT by giving $f_{\mu\nu}$ dynamics. While these tend to possess instabilities as well, those instabilities might find a resolution in the nonlinear dynamics (through a Vainshtein-like mechanism) or by pushing the era of instability to the very early Universe.

== 3D massive gravity ==
A special case exists in three dimensions, where a massless graviton does not propagate any degrees of freedom. Here several ghost-free theories of a massive graviton, propagating two degrees of freedom, can be defined. In the case of topologically massive gravity one has the action

$$S = \frac{M_3}{2}\int d^3x \sqrt{-g}(R-2\Lambda)+\frac{1}{4\mu}\epsilon^{\lambda\mu\nu}\Gamma^\rho_{\lambda\sigma}\left(\partial_\mu\Gamma^\sigma_{\rho\nu}+\frac23\Gamma^\sigma_{\mu\alpha}\Gamma^\alpha_{\nu\rho}\right),$$

with $M_3$ the three-dimensional Planck mass. This is three-dimensional general relativity supplemented by a Chern–Simons-like term built out of the Christoffel symbols.

More recently, a theory referred to as new massive gravity has been developed, which is described by the action

$$S = M_3\int d^3x \sqrt{-g} \left[\pm R + \frac{1}{m^2} \left(R_{\mu\nu}R^{\mu\nu} - \frac 3 8 R^2\right)\right].$$

== Relation to gravitational waves ==
The 2016 discovery of gravitational waves and subsequent observations have yielded constraints on the maximum mass of gravitons, if they are massive at all. Following the GW170104 event, the graviton's Compton wavelength was found to be at least 1.6×10^{16} m, or about 1.6 light-years, corresponding to a graviton mass of no more than 7.7×10^{−23} eV/c^{2}. This relation between wavelength and energy is calculated with the same formula (the Planck–Einstein relation) that relates electromagnetic wavelength to photon energy. However, photons, which have only energy and no mass, are fundamentally different from massive gravitons in this respect, since the Compton wavelength of the graviton is not equal to the gravitational wavelength. Instead, the lower-bound graviton Compton wavelength is about 9×10^{9} times greater than the gravitational wavelength for the GW170104 event, which was ~1,700 km. This is because the Compton wavelength is defined by the rest mass of the graviton and is an invariant scalar quantity.

== See also ==
- Accelerating expansion of the universe – Cosmological phenomenon
- Alternatives to general relativity – Proposed theories of gravity
- Horndeski's theory
- Bimetric gravity – Proposed theories of gravity
- DGP model – Proposed model of gravity
- Scalar–tensor theory – Theory in physics with scalars and tensors both describing a force or interaction
- Dual graviton
