= Dual graviton =

Hypothetical particle found in supergravity

- Composition: elementary particle
- Family: gauge boson
- Interactions: gravitation
- Status: hypothetical
- Antiparticle: self
- Theorized: 2000s
- Electric charge: 0 e
- Spin: 2 ħ

In theoretical physics, the dual graviton is a hypothetical elementary particle that is a dual of the graviton under electric–magnetic duality, as an S-duality, predicted by some formulations of eleven-dimensional supergravity.

The dual graviton was first hypothesized in 1980. It was theoretically modeled in 2000s, which was then predicted in eleven-dimensional mathematics of SO(8) supergravity in the framework of electric–magnetic duality. It again emerged in the E_{11} generalized geometry in eleven dimensions, and the E_{7} generalized vielbein-geometry in eleven dimensions. While there is no local coupling between graviton and dual graviton, the field introduced by dual graviton may be coupled to a BF model as non-local gravitational fields in extra dimensions.

A massive dual gravity of Ogievetsky–Polubarinov model can be obtained by coupling the dual graviton field to the curl of its own energy–momentum tensor.

The previously mentioned theories of dual graviton are in flat space. In de Sitter (dS) and anti-de Sitter (AdS) spaces, the massless dual graviton exhibits less gauge symmetries dynamics compared with those of Curtright field in flat space, hence the mixed-symmetry field propagates in more degrees of freedom. However, the dual graviton in (A)dS transforms under GL(D) representation, which is identical to that of massive dual graviton in flat space. This apparent paradox can be resolved using the unfolding technique in Brink, Metsaev, and Vasiliev conjecture. For the massive dual graviton in (A)dS, the flat limit is clarified after expressing dual field in terms of the Stueckelberg coupling of a massless spin-2 field with a Proca field.

== Dual linearized gravity ==
The dual formulations of linearized gravity are described by a mixed Young symmetry tensor $T_{\lambda_1 \lambda_2 \cdots \lambda_{D-3} \mu}$, the so-called dual graviton, in any spacetime dimension D > 4 with the following characters:

$$T_{\lambda_1 \lambda_2 \cdots \lambda_{D-3} \mu} = T_{[\lambda_1 \lambda_2 \cdots \lambda_{D-3}] \mu},$$
$$T_{[\lambda_1 \lambda_2 \cdots \lambda_{D-3} \mu]} = 0.$$

where square brackets show antisymmetrization.

For 5-D spacetime, the spin-2 dual graviton is described by the Curtright field $T_{\alpha\beta\gamma}$. The symmetry properties imply that

$$T_{\alpha\beta\gamma} = T_{[\alpha\beta]\gamma},$$
$$T_{[\alpha\beta]\gamma}+T_{[\beta\gamma]\alpha}+T_{[\gamma\alpha ]\beta} = 0.$$

The Lagrangian action for the spin-2 dual graviton $T_{\lambda_1 \lambda_2\mu}$ in 5-D spacetime, the Curtright field, becomes

$${\cal L}_{\rm dual}=-\frac{1}{12}\left(F_{[\alpha\beta\gamma]\delta}F^{[\alpha\beta\gamma]\delta}-3F_{[\alpha\beta\xi]}{}^{\xi}F^{[\alpha\beta\lambda]}{}_{\lambda}\right),$$

where $F_{\alpha\beta\gamma\delta}$ is defined as

$$F_{[\alpha\beta\gamma]\delta}=\partial_{\alpha} T_{[\beta\gamma ]\delta}+\partial_{\beta}T_{[\gamma\alpha]\delta} +\partial_{\gamma}T_{[\alpha\beta]\delta},$$

and the gauge symmetry of the Curtright field is

$$\delta_{\sigma,\alpha} T_{[\alpha\beta]\gamma}=2(\partial_{[\alpha} \sigma_{\beta]\gamma} +\partial_{[\alpha}\alpha_{\beta]\gamma}-\partial_{\gamma}\alpha_{\alpha\beta}).$$

The dual Riemann curvature tensor of the dual graviton is defined as follows:

$$E_{[\alpha\beta\delta][\varepsilon\gamma]}\equiv\frac{1}{2}
(\partial_{\varepsilon}F_{[\alpha\beta\delta]\gamma}-\partial_{\gamma}F_{[\alpha\beta\delta]\varepsilon}),$$

and the dual Ricci curvature tensor and scalar curvature of the dual graviton become, respectively

$$E_{[\alpha\beta]\gamma}= g^{\varepsilon\delta} E_{[\alpha\beta\delta][\varepsilon\gamma]},$$
$$E_{\alpha}=g^{\beta\gamma}E_{[\alpha\beta]\gamma}.$$

They fulfill the following Bianchi identities

$$\partial_{\alpha}(E^{[\alpha\beta]\gamma}+g^{\gamma[\alpha}E^{\beta]})= 0,$$

where $g^{\alpha\beta}$ is the 5-D spacetime metric.

== Massive dual gravity ==
In 4-D, the Lagrangian of the spinless massive version of the dual gravity is

$$\mathcal{L^{\rm spinless}_{\rm dual, massive}} = -\frac{1}{2}u+\frac{1}{2}(v-gu)^2+\frac{1}{3}g(v-gu)^3 \sideset{_3}{_2}F(1,\frac{1}{2},\frac{3}{2};2,\frac{5}{2};-4g^2(v-gu)^2),$$

where $V^{\mu}=\frac{1}{6}\epsilon^{\mu\alpha\beta\gamma}V_{\alpha\beta\gamma}~, v=V_{\mu}V^{\mu} \text{and} ~u=\partial_{\mu}V^{\mu}.$ The coupling constant $g/m$ appears in the equation of motion to couple the trace of the conformally improved energy momentum tensor $\theta$ to the field as in the following equation

$$\left(\Box+m^2\right)V_{\mu}=\frac{g}{m}\partial_{\mu}\theta.$$

For the spin-2 massive dual gravity in 4-D, the Lagrangian is formulated in terms of the Hessian matrix that also constitutes Horndeski theory (Galileons/massive gravity) through

$$\text{det} (\delta^\mu_\nu+\frac{g}{m}K^\mu_\nu)=1-\frac{1}{2}(g/m)^2K_\alpha^\beta K_\beta^\alpha+\frac{1}{3}(g/m)^3K_\alpha^\beta K_\beta^\gamma K_\gamma^\alpha+\frac{1}{8}(g/m)^4\left[(K_\alpha^\beta K_\beta^\alpha)^2-2K_\alpha^\beta K_\beta^\gamma K_\gamma^\delta K_\delta^\alpha\right],$$

where $K_\mu^\nu=3 \partial_\alpha T_{[\beta\gamma]\mu}\epsilon^{\alpha\beta\gamma\nu}$.

So the zeroth interaction part, i.e., the third term in the Lagrangian, can be read as $K_\alpha^\beta \theta_\beta^\alpha$ so the equation of motion becomes

$$\left(\Box+m^2\right)T_{[\alpha\beta]\gamma}=\frac{g}{m}P_{\alpha\beta\gamma,\lambda\mu\nu}\partial^{\lambda}\theta^{\mu\nu},$$

where the $P_{\alpha\beta\gamma,\lambda\mu\nu}=2\epsilon_{\alpha\beta\lambda\mu}\eta_{\gamma\nu}+\epsilon_{\alpha\gamma\lambda\mu}\eta_{\beta\nu}-\epsilon_{\beta\gamma\lambda\mu}\eta_{\alpha\nu}$ is Young symmetrizer of such SO(2) theory.

For solutions of the massive theory in arbitrary N-D, i.e., Curtright field $T_{[\lambda_1\lambda_2...\lambda_{N-3}]\mu}$, the symmetrizer becomes that of SO(N-2).

== Dual graviton coupling with BF theory ==
Dual gravitons have interaction with topological BF model in D = 5 through the following Lagrangian action

$$S_{\rm L} = \int d^{5}x( {\cal L}_{\rm dual} + {\cal L}_{\rm BF}).$$

where

$${\cal L}_{\rm BF}=Tr[\mathbf{B}\wedge \mathbf{F}]$$

Here, $\mathbf{F}\equiv d\mathbf{A} \sim R_{ab}$ is the curvature form, and $\mathbf{B} \equiv e^{a} \wedge e^{b}$ is the background field.

In principle, it should similarly be coupled to a BF model of gravity as the linearized Einstein–Hilbert action in D > 4:

$$S_{\rm BF} = \int d^{5}x {\cal L}_{\rm BF} \sim S_{\rm EH} = {1 \over 2} \int \mathrm{d}^5x R \sqrt{-g}.$$

where $g=\det(g_{\mu\nu})$ is the determinant of the metric tensor matrix, and $R$ is the Ricci scalar.

== Dual gravitoelectromagnetism ==
In similar manner while we define gravitoelectromagnetism for the graviton, we can define electric and magnetic fields for the dual graviton. There are the following relation between the gravitoelectric field $E_{ab}[h_{ab}]$ and gravitomagnetic field $B_{ab}[h_{ab}]$ of the graviton $h_{ab}$ and the gravitoelectric field $E_{ab}[T_{abc}]$ and gravitomagnetic field $B_{ab}[T_{abc}]$ of the dual graviton $T_{abc}$:

$$B_{ab}[T_{abc}]=E_{ab}[h_{ab}]$$
$$E_{ab}[T_{abc}]=-B_{ab}[h_{ab}]$$

and scalar curvature $R$ with dual scalar curvature $E$:

$$E={\star} R$$
$$R=-{\star} E$$

where ${\star}$ denotes the Hodge star operator.

== Dual graviton in conformal gravity ==
The free (4,0) conformal gravity in D = 6 is defined as

$$\mathcal{S}=\int \mathrm{d}^6x \sqrt{-g} C_{ABCD}C^{ABCD},$$

where $C_{ABCD}$ is the Weyl tensor in D = 6. The free (4,0) conformal gravity can be reduced to the graviton in the ordinary space, and the dual graviton in the dual space in D = 4.

It is easy to notice the similarity between the Lanczos tensor, that generates the Weyl tensor in geometric theories of gravity, and Curtright tensor, particularly their shared symmetry properties of the linearized spin connection in Einstein's theory. However, Lanczos tensor is a tensor of geometry in D=4, meanwhile Curtright tensor is a field tensor in arbitrary dimensions.

== See also ==
- Graviton
- Gravitino
- Gravity
- Gravitoelectromagnetism
- Curtright field
- Taub–NUT space
- Nielsen–Olesen vortex
- 't Hooft loop
- Dual photon
- Massive gravity
- Horndeski's theory
- List of hypothetical particles
