= Gregory Gabadadze =

Georgian American physicist (born 1964)

- გრიგოლ (გიგა) გაბადაძე
- Born: Georgia
- Education: Moscow State University (BS and MS); Rutgers University (PhD)
- Known for: dRGT theory DGP model
- Awards: NASA Beyond Einstein Foundation Science Award (2005)
- Scientific career
- Fields: Theoretical physics
- Workplaces: New York University
- Doctoral advisor: Glennys Farrar
- Doctoral students: Rachel Rosen

Gregory Gabadadze is a theoretical physicist specializing in the fields of gravity, cosmology and particle physics. He holds the position of Professor of Physics at New York University, where he also serves as the Dean for Science in the School for Arts & Sciences. In his previous roles at NYU, Gabadadze was the Chair of the Department of Physics and the Director of the Center for Cosmology and Particle Physics.

Gabadadze's work has significantly contributed to the understanding of gravitational theories, including the development of the Dvali-Gabadadze-Porrati brane-world model and the de Rham-Gabadadze-Tolley (dRGT) theory of massive gravity.

== Early life and education ==
Gregory Gabadadze's father is an emeritus professor of chemistry who served as the Dean of Chemical Technology and Metallurgy, and his mother is a former lecturer in analytical chemistry and environmental science, both at the Georgian Technical University, in Tbilisi, Georgia. Gabadadze studied in Tbilisi Public School #61, and concurrently took physics and mathematics classes at the Georgian Technical University under Revaz Dogonadze, who introduced him to the Feynman Lectures on Physics. After Dogonadze's passing, Gabadadze studied the Feynman Lectures independently during his high school years. He then completed bachelor's and master's studies at Moscow State University, followed by a PhD from Rutgers University, where he conducted his research under the supervision of Glennys Farrar.

== Research and career ==
Gabadadze has held a variety of positions in academia and research throughout his career. He began at New York University (NYU) as a Research Scientist in the Department of Physics from 1998 to 2000. During this period, in 2000, he collaborated with Gia Dvali and Massimo Porrati to propose the DGP model of gravity. This model, which assumes the existence of a 4+1-dimensional Minkowski space with a 3+1-dimensional space embedded within it, was notable for its two-part action involving both 4-D and 5-D Einstein–Hilbert actions and was proposed to explain cosmic acceleration without the need for a small but non-zero vacuum energy density.

Following his work on the DGP model, Gabadadze became a Research Associate at the W.I. Fine Theoretical Physics Institute at the University of Minnesota, a position he held from 2000 to 2002. He then spent a year as a Fellow in the Theory Division at CERN in Geneva, Switzerland (2002 – 2003) before returning to NYU as an Assistant Professor in the Department of Physics from 2003 to 2007. He was then promoted to Associate Professor, serving in this role from 2007 to 2011.

In 2008, Gabadadze took on the role of Director of the Center for Cosmology and Particle Physics in the Department of Physics at NYU, a position he held until 2013, with a sabbatical in the 2011/2012 academic year. During his directorship, in 2010, he co-developed a nonlinear theory of massive graviton, known as the "de Rham-Gabadadze-Tolley (dRGT) theory," with de Rham and Andrew J. Tolley. This theory, which is theoretically consistent and ghost-free, became a significant contribution to the field of massive gravity.

In 2011, Gabadadze was appointed as a Professor in the Department of Physics at NYU. Since 2017, he has worked part-time as the Associate Director for Physics in the Mathematics and Physical Sciences Division, and since 2023, as a Senior Vice President for Physics at The Simons Foundation. He also served as the Chair of the Department of Physics at NYU from 2013 to 2019.

In 2019, Gabadadze was named the Divisional Dean for Science in the Faculty of Arts and Science at NYU, and in 2021, he expanded his administrative roles by becoming the Vice Dean for Research in Arts and Science at NYU.

== Controversy Over Faculty Dismissal ==
In 2022 retired Princeton Professor Maitland Jones Jr. signed a one year contract with NYU to teach Organic Chemistry classes after he had retired from Princeton University in 2007. The contract was renewable only upon satisfactory performance. Gabadadze did not renew Jones' contract. In October 2022, a New York Times article reported that Gabadadze controversially fired Maitland Jones Jr. after students complained that Jones's organic chemistry class was arbitrarily graded and too hard. Some of Jones's colleagues objected that Gabadadze set "a precedent, completely lacking in due process, that could undermine faculty freedoms and correspondingly enfeeble proven pedagogic practices.” In the same article, NYU spokesman John Beckman noted Jones's course evaluations “were by far the worst, not only among members of the chemistry department, but among all the university’s undergraduate science courses" and that the professor had received many student complaints about his “dismissiveness, unresponsiveness, condescension and opacity about grading.”

== Selected publications ==
A list of Gabadadze's publications can be found on arXiv and INSPIRE-HEP

- Dvali, Gia; Gabadadze, Gregory; Porrati, Massimo (2000). "4D gravity on a brane in 5D Minkowski space". Physics Letters B. 485 (1–3): 208–214. arXiv:hep-th/0005016. Bibcode:2000PhLB..485..208D. doi:10.1016/S0370-2693(00)00669-9.
- De Rham, Claudia; Gabadadze, Gregory (2010). "Generalization of the Fierz-Pauli action". Physical Review D. 82 (4) 044020. arXiv:1007.0443. Bibcode:2010PhRvD..82d4020D. doi:10.1103/PhysRevD.82.044020.
- De Rham, Claudia; Gabadadze, Gregory; Tolley, Andrew J. (2011). "Resummation of Massive Gravity". Physical Review Letters. 106 (23) 231101. arXiv:1011.1232. Bibcode:2011PhRvL.106w1101D. doi:10.1103/PhysRevLett.106.231101. PMID 21770493.
