= Massimo Porrati =

Italian physicist

Massimo Porrati (born 1961 in Genova, Italy) is a professor of physics and a member of the Center for Cosmology and Particle Physics at New York University. He graduated from the Scuola Normale Superiore di Pisa, Italy with a "Diploma di Scienze" degree in 1985. Later he worked as a postdoctoral fellow at UCLA and UC Berkeley in the USA. He was a research scientist at the INFN section in Pisa, Italy, in collaboration with CERN, where he over the years has spent several periods, before joining NYU in 1992. His major research interests are string theory, supersymmetry and supergravity, nonperturbative aspects of strings and quantum field theory, and cosmology.

Among other things, Porrati is known for his work on the large-distance modification of gravity and its application to the cosmological constant problem. With Gia Dvali and Gregory Gabadadze he co-pioneered and advanced this direction by proposing a generally covariant model of infrared modification of gravity (the so-called DGP model), and studying many novel and subtle features of this class of models.

Porrati held the Marie Curie Chair (2005–2007) at the Theoretical Physics Group in the Scuola Normale Superiore di Pisa, Italy. Massimo was featured on a video produced by the Wired YouTube channel titled 'Theoretical Physicist Brian Greene Explains Time in 5 Levels of Difficulty', where Greene mentioned their collaboration on research.
