= DGP model =

Proposed model of gravity

The Dvali–Gabadadze–Porrati (DGP) model is a model of gravity proposed by Gia Dvali, Gregory Gabadadze, and Massimo Porrati in 2000. The model is popular among some model builders, but has resisted being embedded into string theory.

== Overview ==
The DGP model assumes the existence of a 4+1-dimensional Minkowski space, within which ordinary 3+1-dimensional Minkowski space is embedded. The model assumes an action consisting of two terms: One term is the usual Einstein–Hilbert action, which involves only the 4-D spacetime dimensions. The other term is the equivalent of the Einstein–Hilbert action, as extended to all 5 dimensions. The 4-D term dominates at short distances, and the 5-D term dominates at long distances.

The model was proposed in part in order to reproduce the cosmic acceleration of dark energy without any need for a small but non-zero vacuum energy density. But critics argue that this branch of the theory is unstable. However, the theory remains interesting because of Dvali's claim that the unusual structure of the graviton propagator makes non-perturbative effects important in a seemingly linear regime, such as the Solar System. Because there is no four-dimensional, linearized effective theory that reproduces the DGP model for weak-field gravity, the theory avoids the vDVZ discontinuity that otherwise plagues attempts to write down a theory of massive gravity.

In 2008, Fang et al. argued that recent cosmological observations (including measurements of baryon acoustic oscillations by the Sloan Digital Sky Survey, and measurements of the cosmic microwave background and type 1a supernovae) is in direct conflict with the DGP cosmology unless a cosmological constant or some other form of dark energy is added. However, this negates the appeal of the DGP cosmology, which accelerates without needing to add dark energy.

== See also ==
- Kaluza–Klein theory
- Randall–Sundrum model
- Large extra dimensions
