= Universal extra dimensions =

Concept in particle physics

In particle physics, models with universal extra dimensions include one or more spatial dimensions beyond the three spatial and one temporal dimensions that are observed.

== Overview ==
Models with universal extra dimensions, studied in 2001 assume that all fields propagate universally in the extra dimensions; in contrast, the ADD model requires that the fields of the Standard Model be confined to a four-dimensional membrane, while only gravity propagates in the extra dimensions.

The universal extra dimensions are assumed to be compactified with radii much larger than the traditional Planck length, although smaller than in the ADD model, ~10^{−18} m. Generically, the—so far unobserved—Kaluza–Klein resonances of the Standard Model fields in such a theory would appear at an energy scale that is directly related to the inverse size ("compactification scale") of the extra dimension,

$M_\text{KK}\approx R^{-1} .$

The experimental bounds (based on Large Hadron Collider data) on the compactification scale of one or two universal extra dimensions are about 1 TeV. Other bounds come from electroweak precision measurements at the Z pole, the muon's magnetic moment, and limits on flavor-changing neutral currents, and reach several hundred GeV. Using universal extra dimensions to explain dark matter yields an upper limit on the compactification scale of several TeV.

== See also ==
- Large extra dimensions
- Kaluza–Klein theory
- Randall–Sundrum model
