= Maitland Jones Jr. =

American chemist and professor

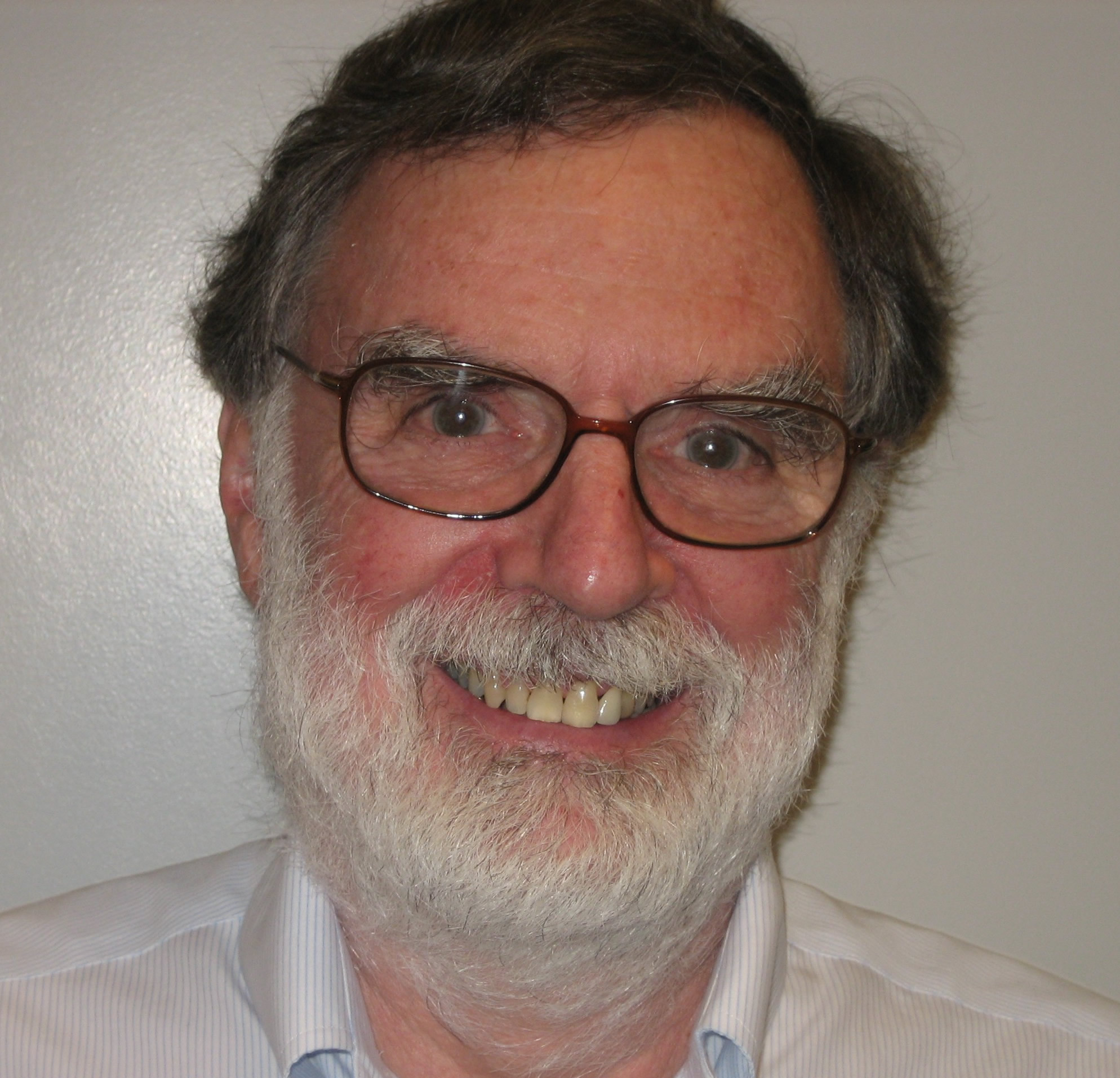
- Born: November 23, 1937 (age 88)

Academic background
- Education: Yale University (BS, MS, PhD)

Academic work
- Discipline: Chemistry
- Sub-discipline: Organic chemistry Experimental chemistry
- Institutions: Yale University; Princeton University; New York University

Maitland Jones Jr. (born November 23, 1937) is an American experimental chemist. Jones worked at Princeton University in his research lab from 1964 until his 2007 retirement. He then taught at New York University from 2007 until his dismissal in 2022. He is known for changing how the subject of organic chemistry is taught to undergraduate students, through writing a popular textbook, Organic Chemistry, and re-shaping the course from simple rote learning to one that focuses on scientific problem solving.

== Education ==
Jones earned a Bachelor of Science in 1959, Master of Science in 1960, and Ph.D. in 1963 from Yale University. His Ph.D. Thesis, completed under the instruction of William von Eggers Doering was titled "The Insertion Reaction of Methylene, Some Chemistry of Fluornylidene, the Pyrolysis of Thujone."

== Career ==
Jones' field of expertise is reactive intermediates, with particular emphasis on carbenes. He has published extensively in the field of quantum organic chemistry, particularly focusing on the mechanism of quantum molecular reactions. His interest areas include carbenes, carboranes, and heterocycles. Over the course of almost forty years, he and his research group have published 225 papers, averaging some five papers per year or one paper per active group member per year.

Jones is also the author of Organic Chemistry texts. He is credited with the naming of bullvalene, which is named after William "Bull" Doering, under whom Jones was studying as a graduate student at Yale University.

He established his Jones research Lab at Princeton from 1964 to 2004. During this time, he published papers with 63 undergraduates, 30 graduate students and 34 postdoctoral fellows and visitors.

=== Teaching ===
Jones is credited as being among the early adapters of the distance education technology, in the late 1960s, using the Victor Electrowriter Remote Blackboard (VERB) system.

After retiring from Princeton in 2007, Jones taught organic chemistry at New York University until spring 2022 on annual contract basis. NYU offers different classes to students majoring in chemistry and pre-med students, and Jones was assigned to teach aspiring doctors. His contract at NYU was not renewed in 2022 after students complained that the class was too hard and did not provide adequate academic support. Jones said that the premed students' study skills and ability to focus had been declining during the previous decade, and then had declined dramatically after the interruption of the COVID-19 pandemic. The non-renewal of Jones' contract concerned professors inside and outside of NYU. Alán Aspuru-Guzik, a professor at the University of Toronto, suggested that the student petition points to a "premed culture" in which the most important outcome of a course is the grade for the medical school application and the effects of social media distractions such as TikTok on the amount of studying done by students. The head of NYU's Chemistry Department Mark Tuckerman, said that the decision not to renew Jones’s contract was made against the department’s recommendation, which was to have Jones teach organic chemistry to students majoring in chemistry, because chemistry majors would appreciate Jones' high standards.

== Textbooks ==
Jones is the first author of an influential textbook on Organic Chemistry. The book, first published in 1997, is now in its fifth edition (2014).

- Organic Chemistry, Jones, M. Jr., Fleming, S.A., W. W. Norton, New York, 1997
- Instructor's Manual and Supplementary Problems Set for Organic Chemistry, Jones, M. Jr., Ovaska, T. W. W. Norton, New York, 1997.
- Study Guide for Organic Chemistry, Jones, M. Jr.; Gingrich, H. L. W. W. Norton, New York, 1997
- Study Guide for Organic Chemistry, Third Edition, Jones, M. Jr.; Gingrich, H. L. W. W. Norton, New York, 2004
- How to Survive and Thrive in Organic Chemistry for Dummies. Second Edition, Jones, M. Jr.; Gingrich, H. L. W. W. Norton, New York, 2004

== Academic experience ==
- Postdoctoral Fellow, Yale University (1963)
- Postdoctoral Fellow, University of Wisconsin–Madison (1963–1964)
- Instructor in Chemistry, Princeton University (1964–1966)
- Assistant Professor, Princeton University (1966–1970)
- Visiting Assistant Professor, Columbia University (1969–1970)
- Associate Professor, Princeton University (1970–1973)
- Professor, Princeton University (1973–2007)
- Visiting Professor, Vrije Universiteit, Amsterdam (1973–1974, 1978)
- David B. Jones Professor of Chemistry, Princeton University (1983–2007)
- Visiting Professor, Harvard University (1986)
- Visiting Professor, Kiev Polytechnic Institute (1990)
- Visiting Professor, Fudan University (1994)
- Professor, New York University (2007–2022)

== Awards and honors ==
- David B. Jones Professor of Chemistry (Princeton University)
