= Raman Sundrum =

Indian-American theoretical particle physicist

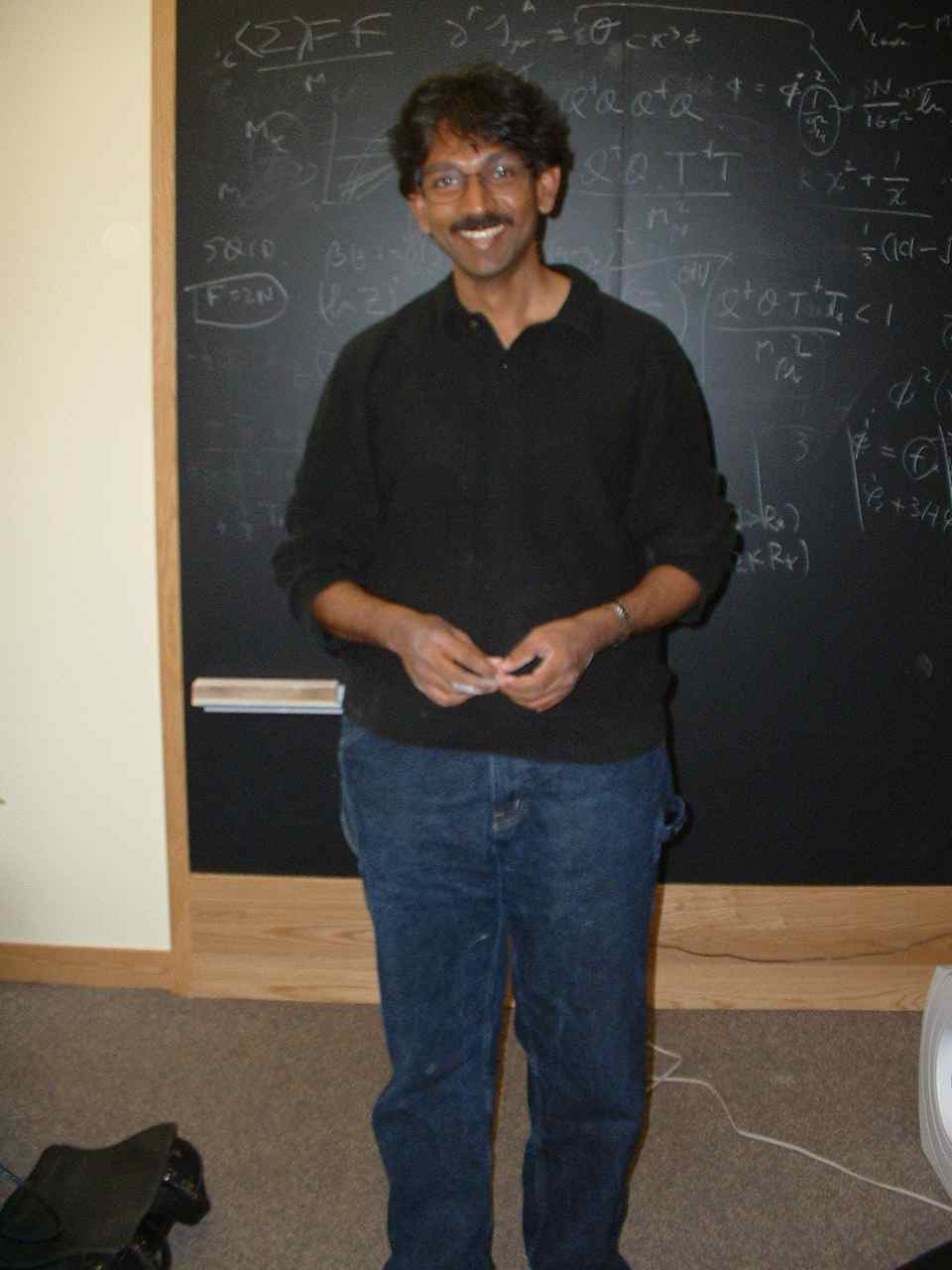
- Born: 1964 (age 61–62); Madras, India
- Education: University of Sydney; Yale University
- Known for: Randall–Sundrum model
- Awards: Sakurai Prize (2019)
- Scientific career
- Fields: Physics
- Workplaces: Johns Hopkins University; Stanford University; Boston University; Harvard University; University of California, Berkeley; University of Maryland

Raman Sundrum (born 1964) is an Indian-American theoretical particle physicist. He contributed to the field with a class of models called the Randall–Sundrum models, first published in 1999 with Lisa Randall. Sundrum is a Distinguished University Professor at the University of Maryland and the director of Maryland Center for Fundamental Physics.

== Biography ==
Sundrum did his undergraduate studies at University of Sydney in Australia and received his Ph.D. from Yale University in 1990. He was one of two Alumni Centennial Professors in the Department of Physics and Astronomy of the Johns Hopkins University. He was elected a Fellow of the American Physical Society in 2003 "for his discoveries in supergravity and in theories of extra dimensions, and for applications to testable models of fundamental physics".

In 2010, Sundrum left Johns Hopkins and moved to the University of Maryland. His research is in theoretical particle physics and focuses on theoretical mechanisms and observable implications of extra spacetime dimensions, supersymmetry, and strongly coupled dynamics.

According to Scientific American, he was considering leaving physics for finance, when his future collaborator Lisa Randall called to propose working together on membranes, or "branes" as they are known. Branes are domains or swaths of several spatial dimensions within a higher-dimensional space. The fruits of that collaboration were papers known as RS-1 and RS-2.

== Honors and awards ==
- 2019: J. J. Sakurai Prize for Theoretical Particle Physics from the American Physical Society "For creative contributions to physics beyond the Standard Model, in particular the discovery that warped extra dimensions of space can solve the hierarchy puzzle, which has had a tremendous impact on searches at the Large Hadron Collider."
