= Giorgi Dvali =

Georgian physicist (born 1964)

Georgi Dvali
- გიორგი (გია) დვალი
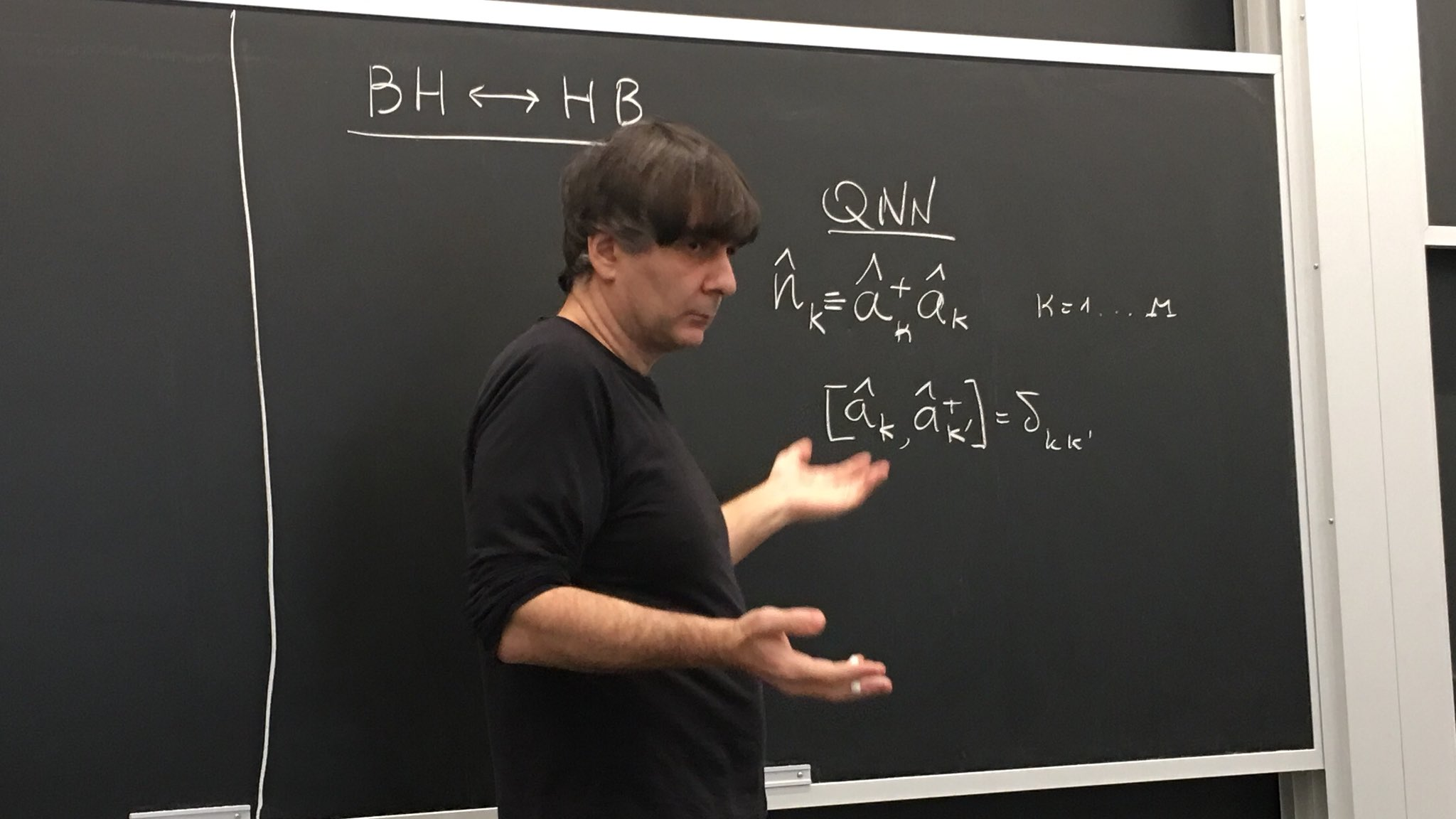
- Born: 30 May 1964 (age 62); Tbilisi, Georgian SSR
- Education: Tbilisi State University
- Known for: ADD model DGP model
- Awards: Mayor's Award for Excellence in Science and Technology (2003); NYU Silver Professorship (2007); David and Lucile Packard Foundation Fellowship; Alfred P. Sloan Foundation Fellowship; Alexander von Humboldt Professorship (2008)
- Scientific career
- Fields: Physics
- Workplaces: New York University; LMU Munich
- Doctoral advisor: Zurab Berezhiani; Juansher Chkareuli

External videos
- Georgi Dvali - Alexander von Humboldt Professorship 2009

Georgi (Gia) Dvali (Georgian: გიორგი (გია) დვალი; born 30 May 1964) is a Georgian theoretical physicist. He is a professor of theoretical physics at LMU Munich, a director at the Max Planck Institute for Physics in Munich, and holds a Silver Professorship Chair at the New York University. His research interests include String theory, Extra dimensions, Quantum gravity, and the Early universe.

Dvali is considered to be one of the world's leading experts in the field of particle physics. Among his many contributions stand his pioneering works on Large extra dimensions and the DGP model of modified gravity.

== Early life and education ==
Dvali was born on 30 May 1964 in Tbilisi, Georgia. He completed his secondary education at the 55th secondary school of Tbilisi and went on to pursue his undergraduate studies at Tbilisi State University's Faculty of Physics where he successfully defended his diploma work in 1985. From 1985 to 1992, Dvali worked at the Elephter Andronikashvili Institute of Physics, earning his Ph.D. in particle physics and cosmology in 1992. He then held postdoctoral positions at the International Center for Theoretical Physics (ICTP) in Trieste, Italy from 1992 to 1993 and at the University of Pisa from 1993 to 1995 under the guidance of Riccardo Barbieri.

== Research and career ==
Dvali talking about information processing of black holes

Dvali is best known for the ADD model, which he proposed together with Nima Arkani-Hamed and Savas Dimopoulos in 1998. It is a scenario inspired by string theory to explain the relative weakness of gravity to other forces, in which the Standard Model fields are confined to a (3+1)-dimensional membrane but gravity can also propagate in additional transverse spatial dimensions that are compact but may be as large as one-tenth of a millimeter. In this framework quantum gravity, string theory, and black holes may be experimentally investigated at the Large Hadron Collider. Dvali's work also includes the large-distance modification of gravity and its application to the cosmological constant problem. With Gregory Gabadadze and Massimo Porrati he co-pioneered and advanced this direction by proposing a generally covariant model of infrared modification of gravity (the so-called DGP model), and studying many novel and subtle features of this class of models.

Giorgi Dvali was invited to the 25th Solvay Conference in Brussels to participate in the discussion of "The Theory of the Quantum World". Dvali is actively engaged in teaching activities. During 1997–1998, he was a professor at ICTP. Currently, he is a professor of theoretical physics at New York University (Center for Cosmology and Particle Physics) and LMU Munich, as well as the director of the Max Planck Institute for Physics (Munich) and a scientist-collaborator at the CERN Center for Atomic Research in Geneva. He is also a distinguished professor of the Free University of Tbilisi.

== Honours and awards ==
Dvali received New York City's Mayor's Award for Excellence in Science and Technology in 2000.

Dvali is a recipient of the David and Lucile Packard Foundation's Packard Fellowship, the Alfred P. Sloan Foundation fellowship, and the Humboldt Professorship (2008).

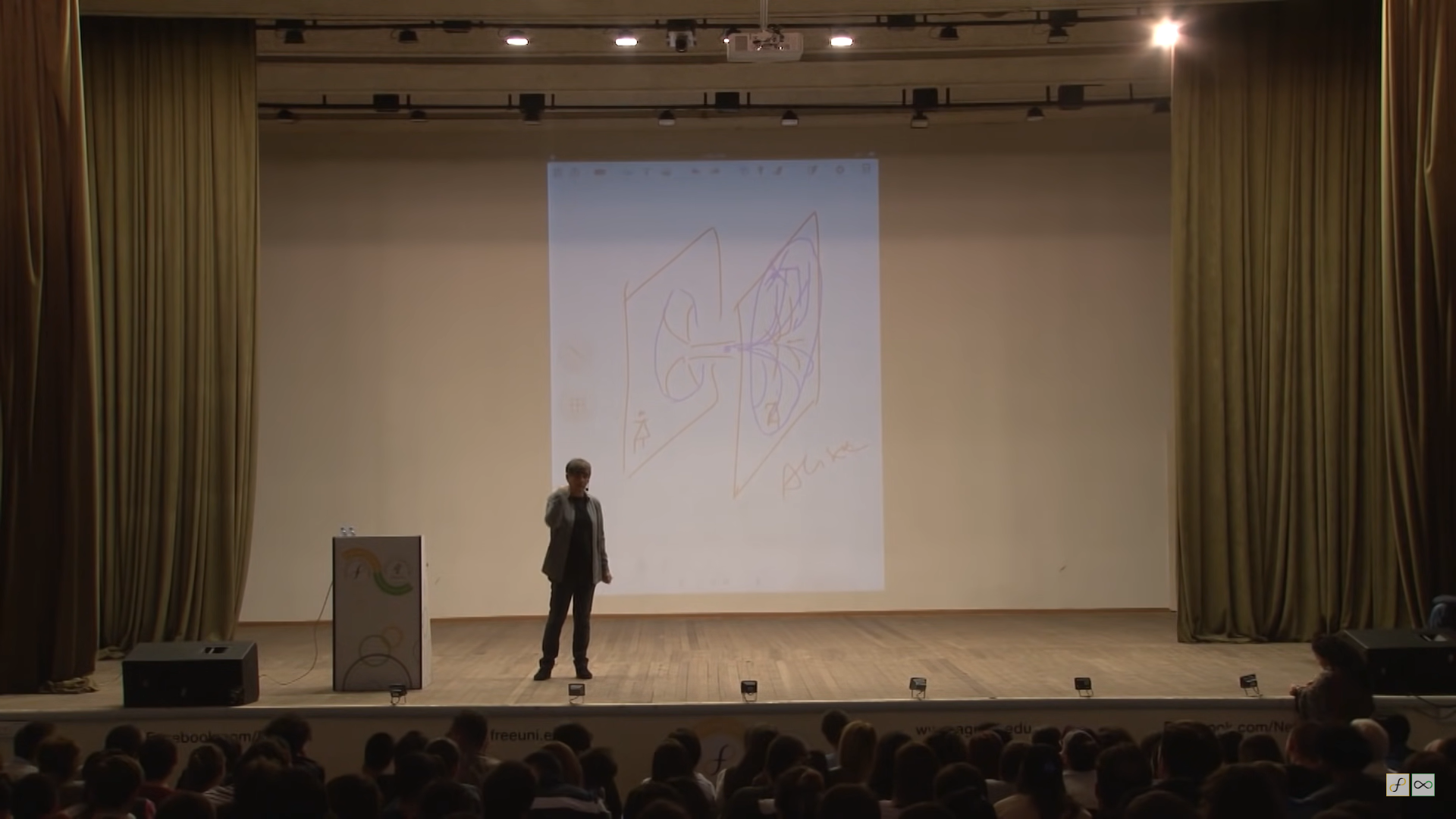
Gia Dvali giving a public lecture about the wormholes in the Free University of Tbilisi

== In popular culture ==
Gia Dvali is a physicist in Georgia. In recent years, he has given many lectures at several Georgian universities for students and faculty. He works in the field of theoretical physics, and his research has been covered by the media and discussed by the public.

== Personal life ==
Dvali is married and is a parent to two children, one son, and one daughter.

=== Political views ===
Dvali has publicly expressed his opposition to the Georgian government's actions during the Russian invasion of Ukraine. He has called on the public to take peaceful actions such as protests, to express their desire for Georgia's future to be aligned with Europe, and for the country to be considered as a candidate for EU membership. He has stated that Georgia's historical identity is rooted in Europe and that the country has always upheld Christian values, not only through physical means but also through the principles upheld by its thinkers.

== Video ==
- Video on Giorgi Dvali's research (Latest Thinking)
