= Glennys Farrar =

American physicist

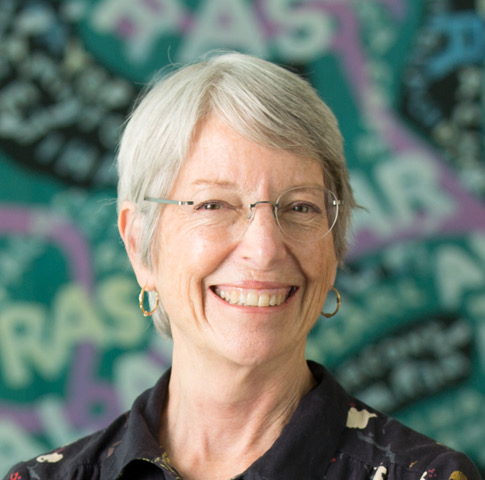
- Farrar in 2023
- Born: 1946 (age 79–80)
- Education: University of California, Berkeley; Princeton University
- Awards: Distinguished Visiting Research Chair for the Perimeter Institute
- Scientific career
- Fields: Theoretical physics
- Workplaces: California Institute of Technology; Rutgers University; New York University
- Thesis: The weak radiative decay of the positive sigma-hyperon and the lambda-hyperon (1971)
- Doctoral advisor: Sam Treiman
- Doctoral students: Gregory Gabadadze

Glennys Reynolds Farrar (born 1946) is an American physicist. She is a professor of physics at New York University who specializes in particle physics, cosmology and the study of dark matter. She has made several significant contributions to the fields of hadron and dark matter phenomenology, helping to develop the working "Standard Cosmological Model". Farrar is a figure in developing many modern particle-search techniques, achieving numerous recognitions including as the Guggenheim Fellowship for Natural Sciences and Sloan Fellowship. She holds a faculty position at New York University (NYU), where she has been since 1998.

== Education ==
Farrar obtained a bachelor's degree at UC Berkeley in 1968, being one of the first undergraduate students to enroll in graduate courses in the physics department. After graduating from UC Berkeley, Farrar went on to earn her PhD from Princeton in 1971, becoming the first woman to receive a physics PhD from Princeton. During this time she began studying Hindi alongside her physics endeavors, culminating in an independent studies program at Delhi University.

== Career ==
After graduating from Princeton, Farrar held post-doctoral positions at the Institute for Advanced Study and Caltech. During her time at Caltech, Farrar improved the current understanding of the Pion form-factor, and proposed a new model for elastic nucleon scattering. She accepted a faculty position at Rutgers University in 1979, where her work continued to probe Standard Model interactions and contemporary developments in Supersymmetric string theory. Farrar joined the physics faculty at NYU in 1998, where she currently resides. While at NYU, she chaired the physics department and founded the Center for Cosmology and Particle Physics.

Farrar has garnered several honors for her achievements in theoretical physics. In 1975, she was awarded a Sloan Research Fellowship, and received a Guggenheim Fellowship in 1984. She was elected in 2003 a Fellow of the American Association for the Advancement of Science (AAAS). In 2014 and 2021, Farrar was selected as a Simons Fellow in Theoretical Physics. She was also the chair of the Division of Astrophysics (DAP) of the American Physical Society for the 2021-2022 period. She was elected to the National Academy of Sciences in 2023. In 2025, Farrar joined the Simons Society of Fellows as a Senior Fellow. As of August 2026, the Simons Foundation announced that they will be funding 12 Math and Physics research groups, one of which being on Cosmic Magnetism which Farrar is the director of.

Farrar has spent many years of her career working on understanding the sources of the highest-energy comic rays. She has significantly contributed to the research conducted by the Pierre Auger Observatory, with more than one-hundred publications in this experiment alone. As a theoretical physicist she has worked on developing tools for particle-detection from high energy sources in the universe. In 2012, Ronnie Jansson (then a graduate student) and Farrar, published an article presenting a new model of the galactic magnetic field.
