= Savas Dimopoulos =

Greek particle physicist

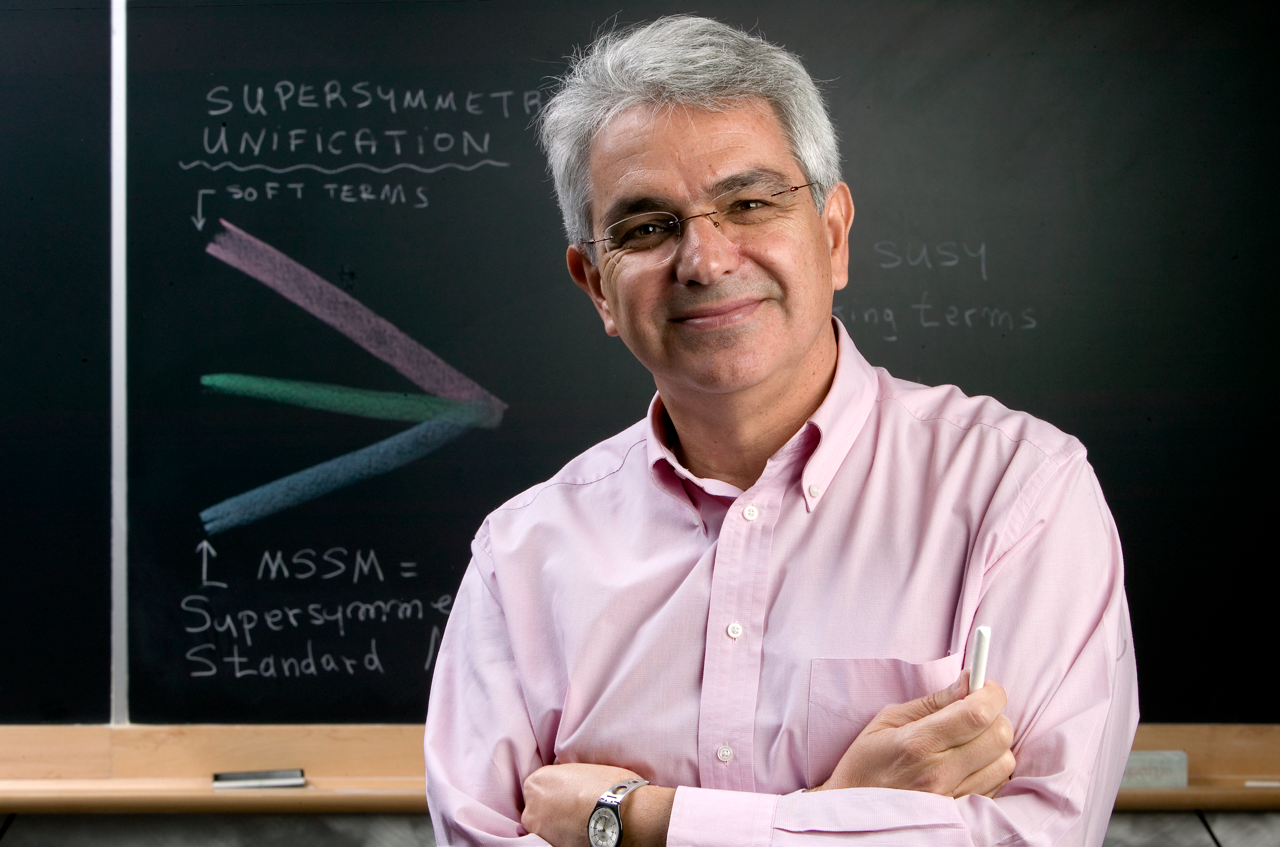
- Born: 1952 (age 73–74); Istanbul, Turkey
- Education: University of Houston; University of Chicago
- Known for: Technicolor; MSSM; Large extra dimensions
- Scientific career
- Workplaces: Stanford University
- Doctoral advisor: Yoichiro Nambu
- Doctoral students: Mary Hall Reno

Savas Dimopoulos (/dɪˈmɒpəlɒs/; Greek: Σάββας Δημόπουλος; born 1952) is a particle physicist at Stanford University. He worked at CERN from 1994 to 1997. Dimopoulos is well known for his work on constructing theories beyond the Standard Model.

== Life ==
He was born an ethnic Greek in Istanbul, Turkey and later moved to Athens due to ethnic tensions in Turkey during the 1950s and 1960s.

== Education and career ==
Dimopoulos studied as an undergraduate at the University of Houston. He went to the University of Chicago and studied under Yoichiro Nambu for his doctoral studies. After completing his Ph.D. in 1979, he briefly went to Columbia University before taking a faculty position at Stanford University in 1980. During 1981 and 1982 he was also affiliated with the University of Michigan, Harvard University and the University of California, Santa Barbara. From 1994 to 1997 he was on leave from Stanford University and was employed by CERN.

Dimopoulos is well known for his work on constructing theories beyond the Standard Model, which are currently being searched for and tested at particle colliders like the LHC at CERN and at experiments all over the world. For example, in 1981 he proposed a softly broken SU(5) GUT model with Howard Georgi, which is one of the foundational papers of the Minimal Supersymmetric Standard Model (MSSM). He also proposed the ADD model of large extra dimensions with Nima Arkani-Hamed and Gia Dvali.

== Awards ==
In 2006, the American Physical Society awarded Dimopoulos the Sakurai Prize, "For his creative ideas on dynamical symmetry breaking, supersymmetry, and extra spatial dimensions, which have shaped theoretical research on TeV-scale physics, thereby inspiring a wide range of experiments." In 2006, he received the Caterina Tomassoni and Felice Pietro Chisesi Prize at the University of Rome, Italy. "The prize recognizes and encourages outstanding achievements in physics. Dimopoulos was lauded by the Tomassoni Committee as "one of the leading figures in theoretical particle physics. His proposal of the supersymmetric standard model has aided the understanding of high-energy physics mechanisms."

He appeared in the 2013 documentary film Particle Fever, about the work of the Large Hadron Collider.

He is a member of the U. S. National Academy of Sciences.

== Work ==
- Baryogenesis at the GUT scale
- Early work on technicolor
- Early work on soft supersymmetry breaking and Gauge coupling unification in the MSSM
- Moduli-mediated millimeter scale forces
- "ADD model" of large extra dimensions, with Nima Arkani-Hamed and Gia Dvali
- Split supersymmetry
