= Graviton =

Hypothetical elementary particle that mediates gravity

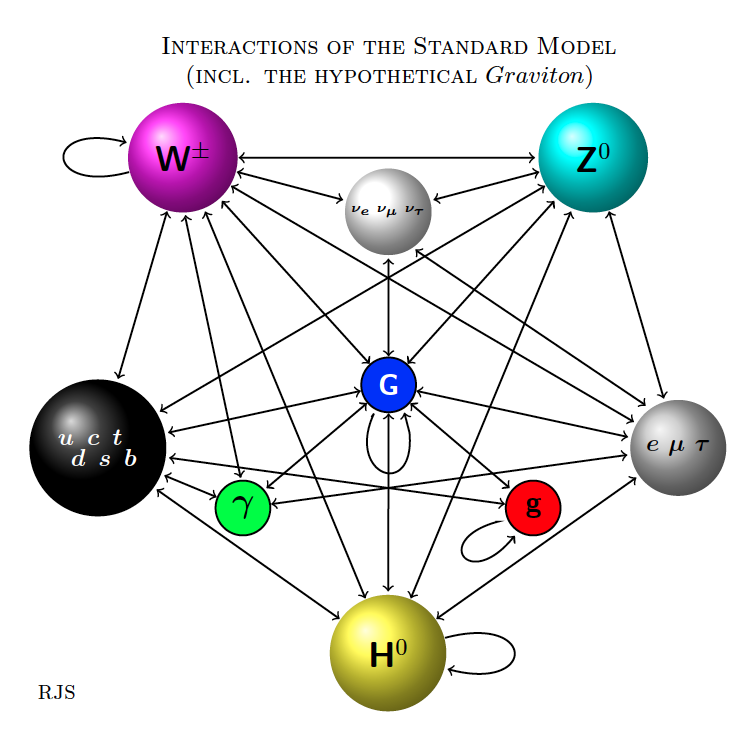
- Fundamental interactions of the Standard Model extended to add the hypothetical graviton
- Composition: Elementary particle
- Statistics: Bose–Einstein statistics
- Family: Bosonic
- Interactions: Gravitation
- Status: Hypothetical
- Symbol: G
- Theorized: 1930s The name is attributed to Dmitry Blokhintsev and F. M. Gal'perin in 1934
- Mass: 0 < 1.76×10^{−23} eV/c^{2}(limit)
- Mean lifetime: stable
- Electric charge: 0 e
- Color charge: No
- Spin: 2 ħ
- Spin states: +2 ħ, −2 ħ
- Parity: +1
- C parity: +1

In theories of quantum gravity, the graviton is the hypothetical elementary particle that mediates the force of gravitational interaction. It is a quantum of gravitational wave energy. There is no complete quantum field theory of gravitons due to the unsolved mathematical problem of renormalization in general relativity. This problem is avoided in string theory, which has the graviton as a massless state of a fundamental string, but that theory has not made sufficient progress.

If it exists, the graviton is expected to be massless because the gravitational force has a very long range and appears to propagate at the speed of light. The graviton must be a spin-2 boson because the source of gravitation is the stress–energy tensor, a second-order tensor (compared with electromagnetism's spin-1 photon, the source of which is the four-current, a first-order tensor). Additionally, it can be shown that any massless spin-2 field would give rise to a force indistinguishable from gravitation, because a massless spin-2 field would couple to the stress–energy tensor in the same way gravitational interactions do. This result suggests that, if a massless spin-2 particle is discovered, it must be the graviton.

== Theory ==
How we can potentially discover the existence of Gravitons with current technology such as what is found at LIGO and some potential pitfalls that these methods have.

It is hypothesized that an undiscovered elementary particle mediates gravitational interactions, dubbed the graviton. The three other known forces of nature are mediated by elementary particles: electromagnetism by the photon, the strong interaction by gluons, and the weak interaction by the W and Z bosons. All three forces appear to be accurately described by the Standard Model of particle physics. In the classical limit, a successful theory of gravitons would reduce to general relativity, which itself reduces to Newton's law of gravitation in the weak-field limit.

== History ==
Albert Einstein discussed quantized gravitational radiation in 1916, the year following his publication of general relativity. The term graviton was coined in 1934 by Soviet physicists Dmitry Blokhintsev and Fyodor Galperin. Paul Dirac reintroduced the term in a number of lectures in 1959, noting that the energy of the gravitational field should come in quanta. A mediation of the gravitational interaction by particles was anticipated by Pierre-Simon Laplace. Just like Newton's anticipation of photons, Laplace's anticipated "gravitons" had a greater speed than the speed of light in vacuum $c$, contrary to modern theories, and were unaffected by quantum mechanics and special relativity as he predated these theories by a century.

=== Gravitons and renormalization ===
When describing graviton interactions, the classical theory of Feynman diagrams and semiclassical corrections such as one-loop diagrams behave normally. However, Feynman diagrams with at least two loops lead to ultraviolet divergences. These infinite results cannot be removed because quantized general relativity is not perturbatively renormalizable, unlike quantum electrodynamics and models such as the Yang–Mills theory. Therefore, incalculable answers are found from the perturbation method by which physicists calculate the probability of a particle to emit or absorb gravitons, and the theory loses predictive veracity. Those problems and the complementary approximation framework are grounds to show that a theory more unified than quantized general relativity is required to describe the behavior near the Planck scale.

== Energy and wavelength ==
While gravitons are presumed to be massless, they would still carry energy, as does any other quantum particle. Photon energy and gluon energy are also carried by massless particles.

Alternatively, if gravitons are massive at all, the analysis of gravitational waves yielded a new upper bound on the mass of gravitons. The graviton's Compton wavelength is at least 1.6×10^{16} m, or about 1.6 light-years, corresponding to a graviton mass of no more than 7.7×10^{−23} eV/c^{2}. This relation between wavelength and mass-energy is calculated with the Planck–Einstein relation, the same formula that relates electromagnetic wavelength to photon energy.

== Experimental observation ==
Unambiguous detection of individual gravitons, though not prohibited by any fundamental law, has been thought impossible with any physically reasonable detector. The reason is the extremely low cross section for the interaction of gravitons with matter. For example, a detector with the mass of Jupiter and 100% efficiency, placed in close orbit around a neutron star, would only be expected to observe one graviton every 10 years, even under the most favorable conditions. It would be impossible to discriminate these events from the background of neutrinos, since the dimensions of the required neutrino shield would ensure collapse into a black hole. It has been proposed that quantum sensing would make detecting single gravitons possible. Even quantum events may not indicate quantization of gravitational radiation.

LIGO and Virgo collaborations' observations have directly detected gravitational waves. Although these experiments cannot detect individual gravitons, they might provide information about certain properties of the graviton. For example, if gravitational waves were observed to propagate slower than c (the speed of light in vacuum), that would imply that the graviton has mass (however, gravitational waves must propagate slower than c in a region with non-zero mass density if they are to be detectable). Furthermore, in the presence of a gravitational wave, it should be possible to observe (via interference or beating effects after a delay line) signatures of stimulated emission or absorption of gravitons with present-day technology. Observations of gravitational waves put an upper bound of 1.76×10^{−23} eV/c^{2} on the graviton's mass.

Solar System planetary trajectory measurements by space missions such as Cassini and MESSENGER give a comparable upper bound of 3.16×10^{−23} eV/c^{2}. The gravitational wave and planetary ephemeris need not agree: they test different aspects of a potential graviton-based theory.

Astronomical observations of the kinematics of galaxies, especially the galaxy rotation problem and modified Newtonian dynamics, might point toward gravitons having non-zero mass.

== Difficulties and outstanding issues ==
Most theories containing gravitons suffer from severe problems. Attempts to extend the Standard Model or other quantum field theories by adding gravitons run into severe theoretical difficulties at energies close to or above the Planck scale: gravitation cannot be renormalized. Since classical general relativity and quantum mechanics seem incompatible at such energies, this situation is not tenable from a theoretical point of view.

One possible solution is to replace particles with strings. Strings are one-dimensional loops that avoid divergences by smearing out the gravitational interactions. A particle identified with the graviton appears in string theory with long-distant interactions described by general relativity. Unfortunately, models based on strings have only been worked out for a few weakly interacting strings.

== See also ==
- Dual graviton – Hypothetical particle found in supergravity
- Gravitino – Hypothetical superpartner to the graviton
- Gravitoelectromagnetism – Analogies between Maxwell's and Einstein's field equations
- Planck units – Units defined only by physical constants
- Polarizable vacuum – Theory of gravity
- Soft graviton theorem – Physics theorem
- Static forces and virtual-particle exchange – Physical interaction in post-classical physics
