= Tung-Mow Yan =

- 顏東茂
- Born: 1937 (age 88–89)
- Education: National Taiwan University (BS); National Tsing Hua University (MS); Harvard University (PhD)
- Known for: Drell–Yan process Cornell potential
- Scientific career
- Fields: Particle physics
- Workplaces: Cornell University
- Thesis: Selected Topics in Theory of Magnetic Charge and Phenomenological Theory of Particles (1968)
- Doctoral advisor: Julian Schwinger

Tung-Mow Yan (Chinese: 顏東茂; born 1937) is a Taiwanese physicist who has specialized in theoretical particle physics, primarily in the structure of elementary particles, the Standard Model, and quantum chromodynamics. He is a professor emeritus at Cornell University.

== Education ==
Yan graduated from National Taiwan University with a B.S. in physics in 1960 and earned an M.S. in physics from National Tsing Hua University in 1962. He then completed doctoral studies in the United States, earning his Ph.D. in physics from Harvard University in 1968 under theoretical physicist Julian Schwinger.

== Research ==
From 1970 to 2009 Yan worked at Cornell University, in particular the Cornell High-Energy Synchrotron Source and Laboratory for Elementary-Particle Physics (combined into the Cornell Laboratory for Accelerator-based Sciences and Education as of 2006). He became a professor and in 2010 he reached the status of professor emeritus in physics.

Other affiliations during Yan's life and work are:

- 1968–1970: research associate at SLAC
- 1973–1974: visiting scientist to SLAC
- 1977–1978: scientific associate at CERN
- 1974–1978: Sloan Fellowship
- 1986: visiting chair professor at the physics department of NTU
- Since 1991: a fellow of the American Physical Society
- 1991–1992: special chair professor, Institute of Physics, Academia Sinica, ROC
- 1997: Director, National Center of Theoretical Sciences, ROC

In the 1970s, Yan and Sidney Drell investigated the important Drell–Yan process of massive lepton pair production in hadronic collisions, which provides a crucial experimental probe into the parton distribution functions. These describe the way that the momentum of an incoming high-energy nucleon is partitioned among its constituent partons.

In the same decade, he pioneered the Cornell potential, shedding light on the properties of heavy quark–antiquark systems (charmonium), with Estia J. Eichten, Toichiro Kinoshita, Ken Lane and Kurt Gottfried.

== Works ==
Tung-Mow Yan is the author or co-author of the following books:

- Tung-mow Yan (1986). QCD, Electro-weak Interaction and Their Grand Unifaction: Summer School in Particle Physics : Papers. Academia Sinica, Tiwan: Science Press.
- Tung-Mow Yan; Kurt Gottfried (2003). Quantum Mechanics: Fundamentals. Graduate Texts in Contemporary Physics. Springer. ISBN 0-387-955-763.

and numerous physics publications in collaboration with other theoretical physicists, including Kurt Gottfried and Sidney Drell.

According to INSPIRE-HEP, as of 2016, he has authored or co-authored at least 72 publications, and has at least 11945 citations.
