= Timothy M. P. Tait =

Canadian-American particle physicist

Timothy M.P. Tait
- Born: May 29, 1971 (age 55); Owen Sound, Canada
- Education: University of California, San Diego (BS); Michigan State University (PhD)
- Known for: Theories of Dark Matter
- Awards: Fellow of the American Physical Society
- Scientific career
- Fields: Theoretical physics, particle physics
- Workplaces: University of California, Irvine
- Doctoral advisor: Chien-Peng Yuan, Michigan State University

Timothy Maurice Paul Tait (born May 29, 1971) is a Canadian-American particle physicist known for his contributions to the theoretical physics and particle physics, particularly in the field of dark matter. He is currently a professor in the Department of Physics and Astronomy at the University of California, Irvine.

== Early life and education ==
Tait was born on May 29, 1971, in Owen Sound, Canada. He received his Bachelor of Science degree from the University of California, San Diego, and his Ph.D. in Physics from Michigan State University, where he worked under the supervision of Chien-Peng Yuan.

== Career ==
After completing his doctoral studies, Tait worked as a postdoctoral researcher at Argonne National Lab and the Fermi National Accelerator Laboratory. In 2007, Tait joined the faculty of the Department of Physics and Astronomy at Northwestern University, and in 2009 moved to the University of California, Irvine. He currently has the title of Chancellor's Professor, and has also served as the chair of the department from 2019 to 2023.

Tait's research focuses on particle physics, cosmology, and the search for dark matter. He has proposed that dark matter may be ordinary matter confined to hidden dimensions, a theory that has received significant attention in the field.

In 2013, Tait was elected a Fellow of the American Physical Society for his contributions to the phenomenology of theories of dark matter.

== Publications ==
- Tait's scientific publications can be found on the INSPIRE-HEP Literature Database
- Tait's opinion article discussing the use of comparisons in recommendation letters within academia .
- Article on slate.com about the current status of the field of particle physics .
- Article in Scientific American about the current status of the search for dark matter .

== Honors and awards ==
In addition to his fellowship in the American Physical Society, Tait has received several other honors and awards throughout his career. In 2016 he was named Friedrich Wilhelm Bessel Fellow by Alexander von Humboldt Foundation, in 2017 he served as Van der Waals Professor at the University of Amsterdam, and in 2019 he received the Mentorship Award by the Division of Particles and Fields of the American Physical Society and the Distinguished Mid-Career Faculty Award for Research from UC Irvine. In 2023 he was named as a Fellow of the American Association for the Advancement of Science.

Tait has an Erdös Number of 4.
