= Kurt Gottfried =

American physicist and academic (1929–2022)

- Born: May 17, 1929; Vienna, Austria
- Died: August 25, 2022 (aged 93); Ithaca, New York, U.S.
- Education: McGill University; Massachusetts Institute of Technology
- Known for: charmonium Cornell potential
- Scientific career
- Fields: Particle physics
- Thesis: Investigations based on the Bohr–Mottelson nuclear model (1955)
- Doctoral advisor: Victor Weisskopf
- Doctoral students: John C. Reynolds

Kurt Gottfried (May 17, 1929 – August 25, 2022) was an Austrian-born American physicist who was professor emeritus of physics at Cornell University. He was known for his work in the areas of quantum mechanics and particle physics and was also a co-founder with Henry Way Kendall of the Union of Concerned Scientists. He wrote extensively in the areas of physics and arms control.

== Early life and education ==
Gottfried was born in Vienna, First Austrian Republic, on May 17, 1929. In 1939, after their home in Austria was raided on Kristallnacht, his family emigrated to Montreal, Quebec, Canada. Gottfried attended McGill University, studying both theoretical and engineering physics.

Gottfried studied with Victor Weisskopf at the Massachusetts Institute of Technology (MIT) from 1952 to 1955, completing his Ph.D. thesis, Investigations Based on the Bohr-Mottelson Nuclear Model. There he studied deformed nuclei, developing models to describe wave functions and energy levels associated with nucleonic motion in a nonspherical force field, and comparing the results of those models to empirical data. His roommate at MIT was Henry Kendall.

== Career ==
Gottfried married Sorel Dickstein in 1955, whom he credits as being instrumental in the founding of the Union of Concerned Scientists and an invaluable collaborator over the course of his life. He then held short-term academic positions at Harvard University (1955–1958), CERN, the Niels Bohr Institute, and again at Harvard (1961–1964) before accepting a position in the physics department at Cornell University in 1964.

Gottfried became an associate professor at Cornell in 1964, a professor in 1968, and professor emeritus in 1998. He was a visiting professor at MIT from 1968 to 1969, and took a leave of absence to work at CERN from 1970 to 1973. He served as department chair of the physics department at Cornell University from 1991 to 1994.

He died on August 25, 2022, at the age of 93.

== Research ==
Gottfried worked with J. David Jackson in the 1960s on the production and decay of unstable resonances in high-energy hadronic collisions. They introduced the use of the density matrix to connect production mechanisms to the decay patterns and described the influence of competing processes ("absorption") on the reactions. Gottfried studied meson–nucleon reactions, high-energy electron–proton scattering and the spectroscopy of heavy-quark bound states; and proposed the Gottfried sum rule for deep inelastic scattering to test the elementary quark model. Gottfried's Quantum Mechanics: Fundamentals, originally published in 1966, is considered "one of the most used and respected accounts of quantum theory".

Gottfried is known for his work in the 1970s on charmonium, with Estia J. Eichten, Toichiro Kinoshita, Ken Lane and Tung-Mow Yan.

Gottfried served as chair of the Division of Particles and Fields of the American Physical Society in 1981. With Victor Weisskopf, he wrote Concepts of Particle Physics (1984), which was hailed as "An authoritative presentation of the basic concepts of particle physics by two internationally recognized leaders in the field."

Quantum Mechanics: Fundamentals was one of the influences spurring John Stewart Bell to write his polemical "Against measurement" (1990). Since Bell's death, Gottfried has become one of his major commentators. The second edition of Quantum Mechanics: Fundamentals, co-authored with Tung-Mow Yan, "is of exceptional interest, historical and otherwise".

== Union of Concerned Scientists ==
He was a co-founder of the Union of Concerned Scientists (UCS). The organization was first formed on March 4, 1969, when Gottfried, Kendall, and other faculty at MIT organized a "teach-in" during which regular research would stop, and students and faculty would examine the "misuse of scientific and technical knowledge" that "presents a major threat to the existence of mankind." Concerns included the Vietnam War, nuclear weapons, and environmental issues.

We are immersed in one of the most significant revolutions in man's history. The force that drives this revolution is ... relentless exploitations of scientific knowledge. That many of the transformations [from this revolution] have been immeasurably beneficial goes without saying. But, as with all revolutions, the technological revolution has released destructive forces and our society has failed to cope with them.

— Kurt Gottfried, March 4, 1969

Gottfried served on the board of directors of the UCS since 1978 and as its vice-chairman and chairman (1999–2009). Issues of particular concern to Gottfried are nuclear arms control, scientific integrity in the face of government pressure, and human rights.

In 1982, Gottfried and Hans Bethe drafted a letter to Leonid Brezhnev protesting the Soviet treatment of peace activists in the Soviet Union. As a member of the executive committee of SOS (Scientists For Sakharov, Orlov, and Shcharansky) Gottfried helped lead successful efforts to bring dissident scientist Yuri Orlov out of exile in Siberia, and offer him a position at Cornell, which Orlov accepted.

Gottfried, Kendall, Hans Bethe, Richard Garwin, and others strongly critiqued the U.S. "Star Wars" missile defense program. Gottfried also co-edited Crisis Stability And Nuclear War (1988). The American Academy of Arts and Sciences cooperated with Cornell University's Peace Studies Program to sponsor a study on nuclear weapons and the command and control systems of the United States and the Soviet Union. Gottfried and Bruce G. Blair edited the resulting book, representing the thinking of fifteen leading analysts.

In 2004, Gottfried drafted the UCS statement Restoring Scientific Integrity in Policy Making, which criticized the Bush administration and called for "restoration of scientific integrity in the United States". It was released on February 18, 2004, and supported by two UCS reports: Scientific Integrity in Policy Making: An Investigation into the Bush Administration's Misuse of Science and Scientific Integrity in Policy Making: Further investigation of the Bush administration's abuse of science.

== Awards and honors ==
Gottfried was a Fellow of the American Physical Society and the American Academy of Arts and Sciences. He received the 1992 Leo Szilard Award. He was also a member of the Council of Foreign Relations.
