= Taormina (surname) =

Taormina is a surname. Notable people with the surname include:

- Anne Taormina, Belgian mathematical physicist
- Giovanni Taormina (born 1988), Italian footballer
- Matt Taormina (born 1986), American ice hockey player
- Sheila Taormina (born 1969), American athlete
- Carlo Taormina (born 1940), Italian lawyer, politician, jurist and academic
