= Classical Electrodynamics (book) =

Graduate textbook by J.D. Jackson

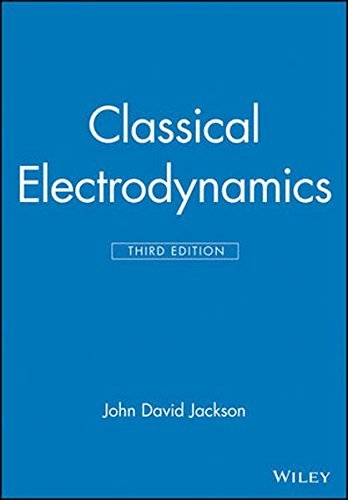
- Third edition front dust jacket
- Author: John David Jackson
- Language: English
- Subject: Electromagnetism
- Genre: Non-fiction
- Publisher: John Wiley & Sons
- Publication date: 1962, 1975, 1999
- Publication place: United States
- Pages: xxi + 808 + 4
- ISBN: 0-471-30932-X
- OCLC: 925677836

Classical Electrodynamics is a textbook written by theoretical particle and nuclear physicist John David Jackson. The book originated as lecture notes that Jackson prepared for teaching graduate-level electromagnetism first at McGill University and then at the University of Illinois at Urbana-Champaign. Intended for graduate students, and often known as Jackson for short, it has been a standard reference on its subject since its first publication in 1962.

The book is notorious for the difficulty of its problems, and its tendency to treat non-obvious conclusions as self-evident. A 2006 survey by the American Physical Society (APS) revealed that 76 out of the 80 U.S. physics departments surveyed require all first-year graduate students to complete a course using the third edition of this book.

== Overview ==
Advanced topics treated in the first edition include magnetohydrodynamics, plasma physics, the vector form of Kirchhoff's diffraction theory, special relativity, and radiation emitted by moving and colliding charges. Jackson's choice of these topics is aimed at students interested in theoretical physics in general and nuclear and high-energy physics in particular. The necessary mathematical methods include vector calculus, ordinary and partial differential equations, Fourier series, Green's function, and some special functions (the Bessel functions and Legendre polynomials).

In the second edition, some new topics were added, including the Stokes parameters, the Kramers–Kronig dispersion relations, and the Sommerfeld–Brillouin problem. The two chapters on special relativity were rewritten entirely, with the basic results of relativistic kinematics being moved to the problems and replaced by a discussion on the electromagnetic Lagrangian. Materials on transition and collision radiation and multipole fields were modified. A total of 117 new problems were added.

While the previous two editions use Gaussian units, the third uses SI units, albeit for the first ten chapters only. Jackson wrote that this is in acknowledgement of the fact virtually all undergraduate textbooks on electrodynamics employ SI units and admitted he had "betrayed" an agreement he had with Edward Purcell that they would support each other in the use of Gaussian units. In the third edition, some materials, such as those on magnetostatics and electromagnetic induction, were rearranged or rewritten, while others, such as discussions of plasma physics, were eliminated altogether. One major addition is the use of numerical techniques. More than 110 new problems were added.

== Table of contents (third edition) ==
- Introduction and Survey
- Chapter 1: Introduction to Electrostatics
- Chapter 2: Boundary-value Problems in Electrostatics I
- Chapter 3: Boundary-value Problems in Electrostatics II
- Chapter 4: Multipoles, Electrostatics of Macroscopic Media, Dielectrics
- Chapter 5: Magnetostatics, Faraday's Law, Quasi-static Fields
- Chapter 6: Maxwell Equations, Macroscopic Electromagnetism, Conservation Laws
- Chapter 7: Plane Electromagnetic Waves and Wave Propagation
- Chapter 8: Waveguides, Resonant Cavities, and Optical Fibers
- Chapter 9: Radiating Systems, Multipole Fields and Radiation
- Chapter 10: Scattering and Diffraction
- Chapter 11: Special Theory of Relativity
- Chapter 12: Dynamics of Relativistic Particles and Electromagnetic Fields
- Chapter 13: Collisions, Energy Loss, and Scattering of Charged Particles, Cherenkov and Transition Radiation
- Chapter 14: Radiation by Moving Charges
- Chapter 15: Bremsstrahlung, Method of Virtual Quanta, Radiative Beta Processes
- Chapter 16: Radiation Damping, Classical Models of Charged Particles
- Appendix on Units and Dimensions
- Bibliography
- Index

== Editions ==
1. Jackson, John D. (1962). Classical Electrodynamics (1st ed.). New York: John Wiley & Sons. ISBN 0-471-43131-1. OCLC 705218816.
2. Jackson, John D. (1975). Classical Electrodynamics (2nd ed.). New York: John Wiley & Sons. ISBN 978-0-471-43132-9. OCLC 488784931.
3. Jackson, John D. (1999). Classical Electrodynamics (3rd ed.). New York: John Wiley & Sons. ISBN 978-0-471-30932-1. OCLC 925677836.

== Reception ==
According to a 2015 review of Andrew Zangwill's Modern Electrodynamics in the American Journal of Physics, "[t]he classic electrodynamics text for the past four decades has been the monumental work by J. D. Jackson, the book from which most current-generation physicists took their first course."

=== First edition ===
L.C. Levitt, who worked at the Boeing Scientific Research Laboratory, commented that the first edition offers a lucid, comprehensive, and self-contained treatment of electromagnetism going from Coulomb's law of electrostatics all the way to self-fields and radiation reaction. However, it does not consider electrodynamics in media with spatial dispersion and radiation scattering in bulk matter. He recommended Electrodynamics of Continuous Media by Lev Landau and Evgeny Lifshitz as a supplement. (Note: See Course of Theoretical Physics, Volume 8.)

=== Second edition ===
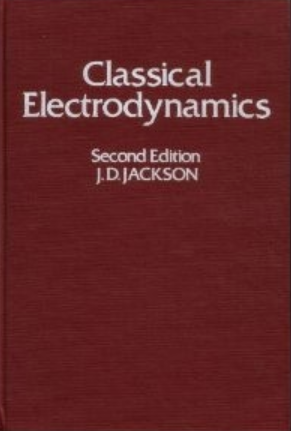
Cover of the second edition (1975)

Reviewer Royce Zia from the Virginia Polytechnic Institute wrote that according to many students and professors, a major problem with the first edition of the book was how mathematically heavy the book was, which distracted students from the essential physics. In the second edition, many issues were addressed, more insightful discussions added and misleading diagrams removed. Extended chapters on the applications of electromagnetism brought students closer to research.

=== Third edition ===
Physicist Wayne Saslow from Texas A&M University observed that some important new applications were added to the text, such as fiber optics and dielectric waveguides, which are crucial in modern communications technology, and synchrotron light sources, responsible for advances in condensed-matter physics, and that fragments of the excised chapter on magnetohydrodynamics and plasma physics were scattered throughout the text. Saslow argued that Jackson's broad background in electrical engineering, nuclear and high-energy physics served him well in writing this book.

Ronald Fox, a professor of physics at the Georgia Institute of Technology, opined that this book compares well with Classical Electricity and Magnetism by Melba Phillips and Wolfgang Panofsky, and The Classical Theory of Fields by Lev Landau and Evgeny Lifshitz. (Note: See Course of Theoretical Physics, Volume 2.) Classical Electrodynamics is much broader and has many more problems for students to solve. Landau and Lifshitz is simply too dense to be used as a textbook for beginning graduate students. However, the problems in Jackson do not pertain to other branches of physics, such as condensed-matter physics and biophysics. For optimal results, one must fill in the steps between equations and solve a lot of practice problems. Suggested readings and references are valuable. The third edition retains the book's reputation for the difficulty of the exercises it contains, and for its tendency to treat non-obvious conclusions as self-evident. Fox stated that Jackson is the most popular text on classical electromagnetism in the post-war era and that the only other graduate book of comparable fame is Classical Mechanics by Herbert Goldstein. However, while Goldstein's text has been facing competition from Vladimir Arnold's Mathematical Methods of Classical Mechanics, Jackson remained unchallenged (as of 1999). Fox took an advanced course on electrodynamics in 1965 using the first edition of Jackson and taught graduate electrodynamics for the first time in 1978 using the second edition.

Jagdish Mehra, a physicist and historian of science, wrote that Jackson's text is not as good as the book of the same name by Julian Schwinger et al. Whereas Jackson treats the subject as a branch of applied mathematics, Schwinger integrates the two, illuminating the properties of the mathematical objects used with physical phenomena. Unlike Jackson, Schwinger employs variational methods and Green's functions extensively. Mehra took issue with the use of SI units in the third edition, which he considered to be more appropriate for engineering than for theoretical physics. More specifically, he argued that electric and magnetic fields should not have different units because they are components of the electromagnetic field strength tensor. Jackson himself responded to Mehra's review.

Andrew Zangwill, a physicist at the Georgia Institute of Technology, noted the mixed reviews of Jackson after surveying the literature and reviews on Amazon. He pointed out that Jackson often leaves out the details in going from one equation to the next, which is often quite difficult. He stated that four different instructors at his school had worked on an alternative to Jackson using lecture notes developed in roughly a decade with the goal of strengthening the student's understanding of electrodynamics rather than treating it as a topic of applied mathematics.

Thomas Peters from the University of Zürich argued that while Jackson has historically been training students to perform difficult mathematical calculations, a task that is undoubtedly important, there is much more to electrodynamics than this. He wrote that Modern Electrodynamics by Andrew Zangwill offers a "stimulating fresh look" on this subject.

James Russ, an experimental high-energy physicist at the Carnegie Mellon University, was of the opinion that examples are challenging, and the fine points of physics are often left as exercises. He added that Modern Electrodynamics by Andrew Zangwill is a better choice for beginning graduate students, but Jackson offers more comprehensive coverage and remains a fine reference. He recommended having both on the shelf.

== See also ==
- List of textbooks in electromagnetism
- A Treatise on Electricity and Magnetism by James Clerk Maxwell
- Introduction to Electrodynamics by David Griffiths, a commonly used undergraduate textbook
