= Gordon L. Kane =

American theoretical physicist

Gordon Kane
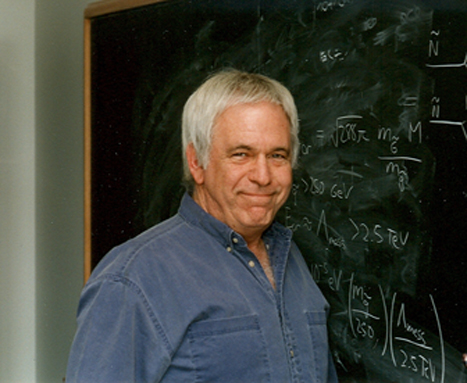
- Gordon Kane, Professor of Physics
- Born: January 19, 1937 (age 89); Saint Paul, Minnesota
- Education: University of Illinois (Ph.D.); University of Minnesota (B.A.)
- Known for: Supersymmetry; Higgs Physics; String Phenomenology; Dark Matter and Cosmology
- Awards: Lilienfeld Prize (2012), Sakurai Prize (2017)
- Scientific career
- Fields: Physics
- Workplaces: University of Michigan
- Thesis: Analysis of the angular distribution of pion-nucleon scattering within the framework of the Mandelstam representation (1963)
- Doctoral advisor: J.D. Jackson
- Doctoral students: Chien-Peng Yuan; Graham Kribs; Howard E. Haber

Gordon Leon Kane (born January 19, 1937) is Victor Weisskopf Distinguished University Professor at the University of Michigan and director emeritus at the Leinweber Center for Theoretical Physics (LCTP). He was director of the LCTP from 2005 to 2011 and Victor Weisskopf Collegiate Professor of Physics from 2002 - 2011. He received the Lilienfeld Prize from the American Physical Society in 2012, and the J. J. Sakurai Prize for Theoretical Particle Physics in 2017.

== Work ==
=== Early fundamental research ===
In 1982 Kane co-led the international Snowmass working group study that pointed to the Superconducting Super Collider (SSC) as the next scientific direction for particle physics. Kane suggested, along with Jack Gunion, at Snowmass studies that Higgs bosons could be best detected at the SSC or LHC via the rare gamma gamma decay mode (finally documented in Nucl. Phys. B 299 (1988) 231, also with Wudka.). The SSC project was finally halted and replaced by the CERN Large Hadron Collider (LHC) at Geneva where this was indeed the discovery method. The LHC continues to probe for the presence of supersymmetry, the leading candidate model for new physics beyond the Standard Model.

Around the same time Kane and Leveille performed the first calculation of the Feynman rules for gluinos, and of the production of gluinos at colliders, which turns out to be one of the most important ways to discover supersymmetry at the LHC.

Gordon Kane is also well known for his work with Howard Haber, putting together and elucidating the structure of the Minimal Supersymmetric Standard Model (MSSM) into a complete and calculable context in 1984. Their seminal article published in 1985 remains one of the single most important references on supersymmetry and the MSSM. A detailed companion report was published in 2002.

Kane made important early contributions to the study of the Higgs bosons, including an upper limit on the Higgs boson mass, implications of electric dipole moments, the muon g-2 experiment, the study of dark matter and its detection, and to early supergravity and string theory phenomenology. With collaborators he pointed out the potential LHC inverse problem and solutions towards its resolution.

=== Recent notable research ===
Kane's more recent work has been in the development of testable models based on string theory, in particular those based on G_{2} compactifications of M-Theory, a predictive approach that might explain the hierarchy between the weak scale and the Planck scale. With colleagues, he has recently re-emphasized the role of neutralino dark matter in the context of cosmic ray data, as well as the importance of connecting dark matter and the LHC - in particular focusing on light gluinos and light neutralinos (the putative superparteners of the gluon and W boson respectively) that arise in supergravity and string theory motivated models. He has argued that these ideas form a consistent framework with a non-thermal cosmological history of the universe.

Recently, he and collaborators have generalized results of compactified string theories, and in particular have shown that scalar superpartners should have masses of order tens of TeV. He and collaborators have also proposed string motivated explanations for major questions in particle theory, including the so-called "little hierarchy" or "fine-tuning" problem, and major related questions in cosmology, including understanding the ratio of the baryonic matter to dark matter in the universe.

=== Scientific summary ===
Kane has published over 200 research articles, with over 20,000 citations and an h-number of 65. He has written or co-authored or edited at least 10 physics books, and has 3 influential Scientific American particle physics articles. A chapter from one book was reprinted in an anthology, with other chapters by Galileo, Newton, Einstein, Hawking, Maxwell, Heisenberg, Weinberg. Two of his more recent books includes "Perspectives on Supersymmetry", and "Perspectives on LHC Physics", both of which provide extensive reviews of the field.

Kane has been elected a Fellow of the American Physical Society, a Fellow of the American Association for the Advancement of Science, a Fellow of the British Institute of Physics, and a Guggenheim Fellow. He has served on many government advisory panels, most recently as chair of the theoretical physics subpanel on the three-year Committee of Visitors of the Physical and Mathematical Sciences Division of the National Science Foundation, the highest evaluation panel the NSF has. Kane also has been on several national laboratory program policy committees. He has served on the international advisory committees of over 40 national and international meetings. He was a winner of the 1998 Physics Today Essay Contest "Physics Tomorrow". He has been Delphasus Lecturer at the University of California, Santa Cruz, distinguished visiting speaker at the University of California, Davis, Dozer Lecturer at Ben-Gurion University of the Negev, Lewiner Lecturer at the Technion in Tel-Aviv, and an American Physical Society Centennial Speaker. In 2017, Kane was awarded the Sakurai Prize. The prize was awarded for his work on the theory of the properties, reactions, and signatures of the Higgs boson.

His books "The Particle Garden", focusing on the Standard Model, and "Supersymmetry and Beyond" focusing on physics beyond the Standard Model, including string/M-theory. And he is a frequent contributor to Edge.org.

== Books ==
- with John F. Gunion, Howard Haber, and Sally Dawson: The Higgs Hunter's Guide, Addison Wesley 1990, Westview Press 2000, CRC Press 2018
- Modern Elementary Particle Physics, Addison-Wesley 1987, Westview Press 1993, 2nd edition, Cambridge University Press 2017
- as editor: Perspectives on Higgs Physics (I,II), World Scientific 1998
- as editor: Perspectives on Supersymmetry , World Scientific 1998.
- as editor: Perspectives on LHC Physics (New 2009)
- as editor: Perspectives on Supersymmetry (I,II) - (New 2010)
- The Particle Garden: Our Universe as Understood by Particle Physicists, Addison-Wesley 1994
- Supersymmetry: Squarks, Photinos, and the Unveiling of the Ultimate Laws of Nature, Perseus Pub. 2000
  - Supersymmetry: Unveiling the Ultimate Laws of Nature, Basic Books 2009 (pbk edition of Supersymmetry, 2000)
  - Supersymmetry and Beyond: From the Higgs Boson to the New Physics, Basic Books 2013 (revised edition of Supersymmetry, 2000)
- with Bobby Acharya and Piyush Kumar: Perspectives on String Phenomenology, World Scientific 2015
