= Chris Quigg =

American theoretical physicist

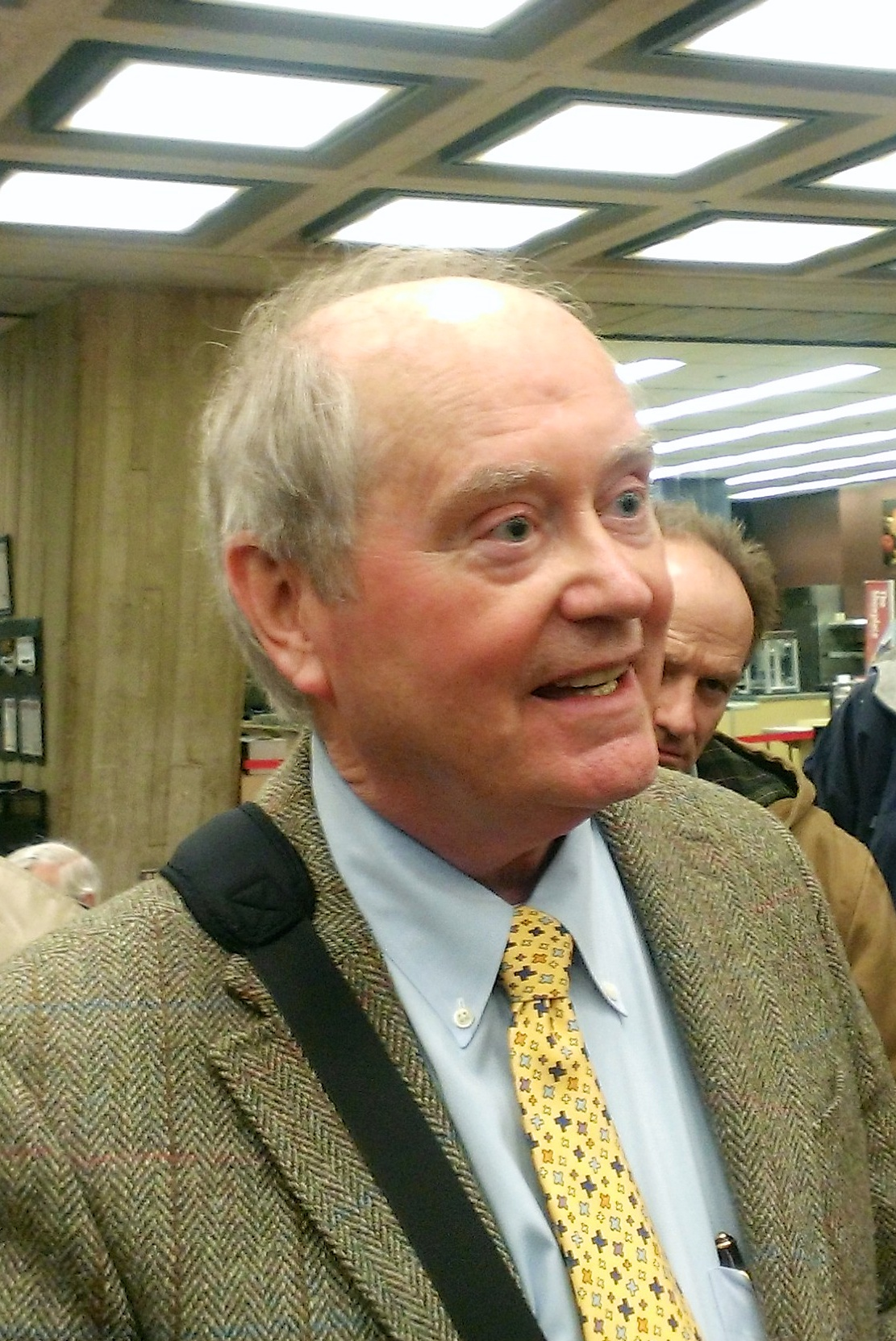
- Chris Quigg, giving a lecture at Fermilab.
- Born: December 15, 1944 (age 81); Bainbridge, Maryland
- Education: Yale University; University of California, Berkeley
- Known for: Collider phenomenology
- Awards: Sakurai Prize (2011)
- Scientific career
- Workplaces: Fermilab; Stony Brook University
- Thesis: Two Reggeon exchange contributions to hadron scattering amplitudes at high energy (1970)
- Doctoral advisor: J. D. Jackson

Chris Quigg (born December 15, 1944) is an American theoretical physicist at the Fermi National Accelerator Laboratory (Fermilab). He graduated from Yale University in 1966 and received his Ph.D. in 1970 under the tutelage of J. D. Jackson at the University of California, Berkeley. He has been an associate professor at the Institute for Theoretical Physics, State University of New York, Stony Brook, and was head of the Theoretical Physics Department at Fermilab from 1977 to 1987.

== Contributions to physics ==
Quigg's contributions range over many topics in particle physics. With Benjamin Lee and H. B. Thacker in 1977 he identified the uppermost theoretical mass scale for the Higgs boson. In 1984 he coauthored "Supercollider Physics" (with Estia Eichten, Kenneth Lane and Ian Hinchliffe), which has strongly influenced the quest for future discoveries at hadron colliders, such as the Fermilab Tevatron, the SSC, and the LHC at CERN. He is also author of Gauge Theories of the Strong, Weak, and Electromagnetic Interactions.

He has made many other significant contributions to the study of the spectroscopy of heavy-light mesons, signatures for the production of heavy quarks and quarkonium, and the study of ultrahigh-energy neutrino interactions. He is an international lecturer and public speaker, and has been Editor of the Annual Review of Nuclear and Particle Science.

He was a consultant to WQED and the National Academy of Sciences for the Infinite Voyage television series and a featured speaker in the companion Discovery Lectures on college campuses. He gave the first Carl Sagan Memorial Lecture in the series Cosmos Revisited at the Smithsonian Institution in Washington. He was featured in The Ultimate Particle, a road movie of particle physics broadcast on ARTE in France and Germany.

With Robert N. Cahn, he wrote Grace in All Simplicity, subtitled "Beauty, Truth, and Wonders on the Path to the Higgs Boson and New Laws of Naturea", a popular book on the history and development of the Standard Model of particle physics,

== Awards and honors ==
Quigg was a recipient of the Alfred P. Sloan Foundation Research Fellowship, 1974–1978, and was elected a fellow of the American Physical Society in 1983. In 2011 Quigg with Estia Eichten, Ian Hinchliffe, and Kenneth Lane won the J. J. Sakurai Prize for Theoretical Particle Physics "For their work, separately and collectively, to chart a course of the exploration of TeV scale physics using multi-TeV hadron colliders"

== Selected publications ==
- Gauge theory of the strong, weak and electromagnetic interactions. Benjamin Cummings 1983, Westview Press 1997, ISBN 0-201-32832-1. 2nd edition, 2013
- with Jonathan L. Rosner: Quantum mechanics with application to Quarkonium. In: Physics Reports. vol. 56, 1979, pp. 167–235 doi:10.1016/0370-1573(79)90095-4
- Electroweak Theory. TASI Lectures, 2002 (PDF; 702 kB).
- Nature's greatest puzzles. SLAC Summer Institute 2004 (PDF; 224 kB).
- Visions- the coming revolutions of particle physics. 2002.
- Top-ology. (history of top-quark physics); shortened and revised version in: Quigg, Chris (1997). "Top-ology". Physics Today. 50 (5): 20–26. arXiv:hep-ph/9704332. Bibcode:1997PhT....50e..20Q. doi:10.1063/1.881890.
- Grace in All Simplicity, Cahn, Robert N, and Quigg, Chris, Pegasus Books, 2023, ISBN 9781639364817
