= Nigel Glover =

British particle physicist

- Born: 20 June 1961 (age 65); Sunderland, England, UK
- Education: University of Cambridge (BA); University of Durham (PhD)
- Awards: Fellow of the Royal Society (2013); Rayleigh Medal and Prize (2017)
- Scientific career
- Fields: Particle Physics Phenomenology
- Workplaces: CERN; Fermilab
- Thesis: Studies of high energy pp collisions
- Doctoral advisor: Alan Martin

Edward William Nigel Glover FRS (born 20 June 1961) is a British particle physicist. He is a professor of physics at the University of Durham. He graduated from Downing College, Cambridge, with a first in Natural Sciences, and went on to complete a doctorate at Hatfield College, Durham.

== Research ==
Glover conducts research on the phenomenology of particle physics. His calculations based on quantum chromodynamics — the theory of the strong nuclear force — are relevant to measurements made at the Large Hadron Collider.

== Awards and honours ==
Glover was elected a Fellow of the Royal Society (FRS) in 2013. His citation reads:

Nigel Glover has made pivotal research contributions to the understanding of data collected at all high-energy particle physics colliders. His theoretical studies of weak boson, Higgs, and particularly jet production are used world-wide. He is especially distinguished for his contributions to the development and exploitation of the perturbative structure of Quantum Chromodynamics, which is vital for precision measurements at the LHC. Glover's numerous technical innovations include the use of helicities for QCD loop amplitudes, the elucidation of the infrared structure of one and two-loop processes, and pioneering work on the second-order perturbative corrections to scattering cross sections.

Glover was the 2017 recipient of the John William Strutt, Lord Rayleigh Medal and Prize of the Institute of Physics.

== Personal life ==
Glover is married to Belgian mathematical physicist Anne Taormina.
