= John William Strutt, Lord Rayleigh Medal and Prize =

The John William Strutt, Lord Rayleigh Medal and Prize is an award of the UK-based Institute of Physics (IOP) for "distinguished contributions to theoretical (including mathematical and computational) physics". The award, named in honour of Lord Rayleigh, consists of a medal with £1,000 and a certificate.

The John William Strutt, Lord Rayleigh Medal and Prize (established in 2008) should not be confused with the Rayleigh Medal, which was established by the Institute of Acoustics in 1970.

== Recipients ==
Year	Name	Institution	Citation
2008	John Chalker	University of Oxford	For important original and innovative contributions to solid-state physics, particularly in the area of exotic quantum phenomena.
2009	Robin Ball	University of Warwick	For his outstanding contributions to the understanding of diverse complex phenomena associated with growth processes and pattern formation.
2011	Arkady Tseytlin	Imperial College London	For his contributions to the understanding of string theory and of its relation to conventional quantum field theories, and in particular to non-abelian gauge theories that form the basis for our current theoretical description of elementary particle interactions.
2013	Edmund Copeland	University of Nottingham	For his work on particle/string cosmology from the evolution of cosmic superstrings, to the determination of the nature of Inflation in string cosmology and to constraining dynamical models of dark energy and modified gravity.
2015	Christopher Pickard	University College London	For his development of new theories and computational tools for the first principles investigation of matter, which have greatly aided the interpretation of magnetic resonance experiments, have revealed a range of unexpected phenomena in materials at extreme pressures, and increasingly underpin computational materials discovery.
2017	Nigel Glover	Durham University	For pioneering new methods for the application of perturbative quantum chromodynamics to high-energy processes involving energetic jets, leading to sophisticated simulation codes that are being used to describe LHC data.
2018	Owen Saxton	Murray Edwards College, Cambridge	For his contributions to the Gerchberg-Saxton computer algorithm, decades ahead of its time but now prevalent in phase retrieval, and for his foundational image processing programs, still influential in front line electron microscopy.
2019	Nigel Cooper	University of Cambridge	For profound contributions to the quantum theory of many-particle systems, concerning both topological phases of cold atoms in artificial gauge fields and novel phenomena in electronic materials.
2020	Kellogg Stelle	Imperial College London	For his seminal contributions to fundamental physics: the first quantum theory of gravity, the construction of braneworld cosmologies, and the discovery of the supermembrane and fundamental work on supersymmetric field theories and supergravity.
2021	Jerome P. Gauntlett	Imperial College London	For distinguished contributions to our understanding of string theory and its application to quantum field theory, black holes, condensed matter physics and geometry.
2022	Benjamin Doyon	King's College London	For pioneering contributions to a new hydrodynamic theory for the large-scale behaviours of integrable systems, which had a major influence in condensed matter, cold atomic and statistical physics research.
2023	Nikolas Mavromatos	King's College London	For fundamental contributions to theoretical physics, especially the suggestion of quantum gravity-induced modifications of the vacuum optical properties, a proposition that led to a new arena of theoretical and experimental investigation.
2025	Mark Dennis	University of Birmingham	For pioneering theoretical work on structured light and topological optics, from knotted fields to polarisation in the daylight sky.
