= Graham Kribs =

American particle physicist (born 1971)

- Born: 1971 (age 53–54)
- Occupation(s): Theoretical particle physicist and academic
- Awards: Fellow, American Physical Society; Ben Lee Fellow, Fermilab

Academic background
- Education: Baccalaureate, University of Toronto; Ph.D., University of Michigan
- Thesis: Supersymmetric phenomenology, model building, and signals (1998)
- Doctoral advisor: Gordon L. Kane

Graham Kribs is an American theoretical particle physicist at the University of Oregon. He was elected a Fellow of the American Physical Society in 2015.

== Early life and education ==
Graham Douglas Kribs was born in 1971, the son of Robert and Margaret Kribs.

Kribs did undergraduate work at the University of Toronto, and he participated in a Fermilab high energy physics program with Drasko Jovanovic. After that summer he "was hooked on high energy physics." He earned a Ph.D. at the University of Michigan in 1998. His dissertation, supervised by Gordon L. Kane, was titled, Supersymmetric phenomenology, model building, and signals.

== Career ==
Kribs pursued studies at the Institute for Advanced Study at Princeton, New Jersey, between 2003–2005, and again in 2013.

Kribs joined the University of Oregon Physics faculty in 2005 and was promoted to full professor in 2015. He serves there as Director of the Institute for Fundamental Science, which "enhances the experimental, theoretical, and astronomy research activities at the University of Oregon." His research interests have included, "new physics, supersymmetry, extra dimensions and black holes".

== Selected publications ==
- Ambrosanio, S.; Kane, G. L.; Kribs, Graham D.; Martin, Stephen P.; Mrenna, S. (November 1, 1996). "Search for supersymmetry with a light gravitino at the Fermilab Tevatron and CERN LEP colliders". Physical Review D. 54 (9): 5395–5411. arXiv:hep-ph/9605398. Bibcode:1996PhRvD..54.5395A. doi:10.1103/PhysRevD.54.5395. PMID 10021229. S2CID 471847.
- Kaplan, D. Elazzar; Kribs, Graham D.; Schmaltz, Martin (July 12, 2000). "Supersymmetry breaking through transparent extra dimensions". Physical Review D. 62 (3) 035010. arXiv:hep-ph/9911293. Bibcode:2000PhRvD..62c5010K. doi:10.1103/PhysRevD.62.035010. S2CID 18231539.
- Csáki, Csaba; Graesser, Michael L.; Kribs, Graham D. (February 1, 2001). "Radion dynamics and electroweak physics". Physical Review D. 63 (6) 065002. arXiv:hep-th/0008151. Bibcode:2001PhRvD..63f5002C. doi:10.1103/PhysRevD.63.065002. S2CID 367373.
- Csáki, Csaba; Hubisz, Jay; Kribs, Graham D.; Meade, Patrick; Terning, John (June 3, 2003). "Big corrections from a little Higgs". Physical Review D. 67 (11) 115002. arXiv:hep-ph/0211124. Bibcode:2003PhRvD..67k5002C. doi:10.1103/PhysRevD.67.115002. S2CID 3102251.
- Csáki, Csaba; Hubisz, Jay; Kribs, Graham D.; Meade, Patrick; Terning, John (August 18, 2003). "Variations of little Higgs models and their electroweak constraints". Physical Review D. 68 (3) 035009. arXiv:hep-ph/0303236. Bibcode:2003PhRvD..68c5009C. doi:10.1103/PhysRevD.68.035009. S2CID 13005769.
- Kribs, Graham D.; Plehn, Tilman; Spannowsky, Michael; Tait, Tim M. P. (October 26, 2007). "Four generations and Higgs physics". Physical Review D. 76 (7) 075016. arXiv:0706.3718. Bibcode:2007PhRvD..76g5016K. doi:10.1103/PhysRevD.76.075016. S2CID 119637441.
- Kribs, Graham D.; Poppitz, Erich; Weiner, Neal (September 17, 2008). "Flavor in supersymmetry with an extended R symmetry". Physical Review D. 78 (5) 055010. arXiv:0712.2039. Bibcode:2008PhRvD..78e5010K. doi:10.1103/PhysRevD.78.055010. S2CID 119178658.
- Appelquist, Thomas; Berkowitz, Evan; Brower, Richard; Buchoff, Michael; Fleming, George; Jin, Xiao-Yong; Kiskis, Joe; Kribs, Graham; Neil, Ethan; Osborn, James; Rebbi, Claudio; Rinaldi, Enrico; Schaich, David; Schroeder, Chris; Syritsyn, Sergei; Vranas, Pavlos; Weinberg, Evan; Witzel, Oliver (March 13, 2015). "Detecting Stealth Dark Matter Directly through Electromagnetic Polarizability". Physical Review Letters. 115. arXiv:1503.04205. doi:10.1103/PhysRevLett.115.171803. S2CID 9466130.

== Awards, honors ==
- 2015 Elected Fellow of the American Physical Society. Citation: For contributions to our understanding of physics beyond the Standard Model, in particular theories with supersymmetry and extra generations of matter.
- 2011 Ben Lee Fellow, Fermilab, "awarded to visiting theorists with outstanding achievements in particle physics".
