= Michael Finnis =

British materials scientist

Professor Michael Finnis FRS
- Born: Margate
- Education: University of Cambridge
- Scientific career
- Workplaces: Atomic Energy Research Establishment; Fritz-Haber-Institut; Imperial College London
- Thesis: Interatomic Forces in Simple Metals (1974)

Michael W. Finnis is a British materials scientist who is Professor of Theory and Simulation of Materials at Imperial College London. He uses atomic-scale computation to understand atomic interactions, grain boundary embrittlement and open system thermodynamics. He was elected Fellow of the Royal Society in 2021, and awarded the Institute of Physics Dirac Medal in 2022.

== Early life and education ==
Finnis was born in Margate. He studied natural sciences at the University of Cambridge, where he specialised in theoretical physics. He remained in Cambridge for his doctoral research, working with Volker Heine on condensed matter physics. His PhD investigated interatomic forces in simple metals. He started working on tight-binding models, and that the total bonding energy of transition metals scaled with the square root of the coordination number (z).

== Research and career ==
Finnis spent fourteen years in the Atomic Energy Research Establishment. He developed theoretical and computational approaches to support the nuclear power industry. When he started working at the AERE, he used an IBM System/360, and eventually a Cray-1. Finnis developed Finnis–Sinclair potentials, which transformed simulations of metals. Finnis–Sinclair potentials took into account the local density dependence of atomic interactions through two terms: the first a short-range repulsive interaction, the second an attractive force described by the square root of a sum of pair of interactions between neighbours. In 1988 he was appointed an Alexander von Humboldt Fellow at the Fritz-Haber-Institut. Finnis eventually moved to the Max-Planck-Institut für Metallforschung, where he started working on the science of interfaces. In 1995 Finnis and Ruth Lynden-Bell founded the Atomistic Simulation Centre at Queen's University Belfast.

In 2006, Finnis joined Imperial College London, where he co-founded the Thomas Young Centre for the Theory and Simulation of Materials. His research involves atom-scale computational models to understand the electronic and optical properties of materials.

== Awards and honours ==
- 2005 Institute of Physics Born Medal
- 2017 Institute of Physics Nevill Mott Medal
- 2021 Elected a Fellow of the Royal Society
- 2022 Institute of Physics Dirac Medal

== Selected publications ==
- Finnis, M. W.; Sinclair, J. E. (July 1984). "A simple empirical N-body potential for transition metals". Philosophical Magazine A. 50 (1): 45–55. doi:10.1080/01418618408244210. ISSN 0141-8610.
- Rainer Schweinfest; Anthony Thomas Paxton; Michael W Finnis (1 December 2004). "Bismuth embrittlement of copper is an atomic size effect". Nature. 432 (7020): 1008–1011. doi:10.1038/nature03198. ISSN 1476-4687. PMID 15616557. Wikidata Q47397228.
- Fabris, Stefano; Paxton, Anthony T.; Finnis, Michael W. (2002-12-03). "A stabilization mechanism of zirconia based on oxygen vacancies only". Acta Materialia. 50 (20): 5171–5178. arXiv:cond-mat/0206080. doi:10.1016/S1359-6454(02)00385-3. ISSN 1359-6454.
- Batyrev, Iskander G.; Alavi, Ali; Finnis, Michael W. (2000-08-15). "Equilibrium and adhesion of Nb/sapphire: The effect of oxygen partial pressure". Physical Review B. 62 (7): 4698–4706. arXiv:cond-mat/0001159. doi:10.1103/PhysRevB.62.4698.
- Finnis, Mike (2003). Interatomic forces in condensed matter. Oxford series on materials modelling. Oxford; New York: Oxford University Press. ISBN 978-0-19-850977-6. OCLC 52696520.
