= Thomas Gehrmann =

German theoretical physicist

- Thomas Gehrmann (2026)
- Born: 1971 (age 54–55); Waltrop
- Citizenship: German, Swiss
- Occupation: Theoretical physicist

Academic background
- Education: PhD., Physics, University of Durham

Academic work
- Institutions: University of Zurich, Department of Physics
- Website: www.physik.uzh.ch/en/groups/gehrmann/team/gehrmann.html

Thomas Gehrmann (born 1971 in Waltrop, Germany) is a theoretical physicist in the field of elementary particle physics. He holds a professorship of theoretical physics at the University of Zurich since 2003.

== Education and career ==
Gehrmann received his doctorate from the University of Durham in 1996, working under the supervision of James Stirling, and held postdoctoral positions at DESY, University of Karlsruhe, CERN and RWTH Aachen.

From 2019 to 2021, he chaired the High Energy and Particle Physics Division of the European Physical Society (EPS).

== Research ==
In his research, Gehrmann focuses on calculations of elementary particle reactions using methods of perturbation theory. He has developed methods that enable the calculation of scattering amplitudes (Feynman diagrams) at higher orders in perturbation theory and their subsequent numerical evaluation. His works concentrates on precision predictions in the theory of the strong interaction (quantum chromodynamics, QCD) and on the description of particle jets.

His research concerns particle reactions in electron-positron and proton-proton collisions, and deeply inelastic electron-proton scattering; these have applications in the interpretation of experimental data and in precision measurements within the fundamental parameters of particle physics.

== Awards and honors ==
- 2027: J.J.Sakurai prize of the American Physical Society, together with Stefano Laporta and Ettore Remiddi.
