= Torbjörn Sjöstrand =

Swedish theoretical physicist (b. 1954)

- Born: 13 November 1954 (age 71)
- Education: Lund University
- Known for: PYTHIA
- Awards: Edlund prize (1992); Sakurai Prize (2012); High Energy and Particle Physics Prize (2021)
- Scientific career
- Fields: Particle physics Theoretical physics Phenomenology (physics)
- Institutions: Lund University
- Thesis: Phenomenological Studies On Jet Fragmentation (1982)
- Doctoral advisor: Bo Andersson; Gösta Gustafson
- Notable students: Peter Skands
- Website: https://www.particle-nuclear.lu.se/torbjorn-sjostrand

Torbjörn Sjöstrand (born 1954) is a Swedish theoretical physicist and a professor emeritus at Lund University in Sweden, where he also got his PhD in 1982. He is best known as the originator and main author of the PYTHIA program, widely used to simulate the complex multiparticle final states of high-energy particle collisions.

Characteristic of his work is that the development of new physical models has gone hand in hand with their implementation in open-source computer code.

== Scientific contributions ==
Sjöstrand's most enduring achievement is the Lund string model for hadronization, devised with Bo Andersson, Gösta Gustafson, and others in the late 1970s and first implemented in the JETSET event generator.

During the 1980s, Sjöstrand also made several other pioneering contributions to the physics modelling of high-energy particle collisions, including the first systematic method for so-called matrix-element corrections, the first theoretically consistent model of initial-state parton showers via backwards evolution, and the first explicit Monte Carlo model of multiple parton-parton interactions (MPI). The latter two in particular (initial-state showers and MPI) were crucial for describing the physics of high-energy collisions with hadrons in the initial state, while the former (matrix-element corrections) was the first step towards reconciling fixed-order perturbation theory with parton-shower resummations, which has since become a core aspect of precision particle-physics phenomenology.

Sjöstrand collected these developments into a new program he dubbed Pythia, named for the Ancient Greek oracle at Delphi (and hence originally written as a proper noun, Pythia, rather than in all-caps, PYTHIA), that extended the physics modelling of JETSET (which it eventually superseded) from electron-positron annihilations and particle decays to also include the physics of hadron-hadron collisions and Deep Inelastic Scattering (DIS). He has also made several other groundbreaking and detailed studies of a broad range of complex phenomena in particle collisions, including some of the first explicit models of so-called colour reconnections, which had significant impact on LEP measurements of the mass of the W boson.

Today, researchers at every major collider-physics experiment, including those at LEP, HERA, Tevatron, RHIC, and LHC, rely on PYTHIA to provide an approximate theoretical baseline for what the detectors should see. Many experiments in adjacent fields (such as B factories, cosmic-ray air showers, and forward-physics experiments) also make extensive use of PYTHIA, as do studies for future facilities such as the Future Circular Collider.

== International roles ==
In his early career, Sjöstrand spent shorter postdoc periods at DESY (Germany) and Fermilab (USA). From 1989 to 1995 he was staff member in the CERN Theory division. From 2004 to 2007, he was back at CERN for an extended sabbatical, to rewrite PYTHIA from Fortran to C++.

He been a leading advocate for the creation of global standards in the field of computational particle physics, in particular to simplify information exchange between Monte Carlo event generators and other software, including the PDG particle codes and the Les Houches Event File format.

== Publications and mentorship ==
Sjöstrand has authored more than 120 peer-reviewed papers (INSPIRE H-index about 85 as of 2026).

In early 2019, the main physics manual of the previous version of the program, PYTHIA 6, became one of only a handful of physics papers to be cited over 10,000 times on the arXiv/inSPIRE database.

As of 2026, the manuals for the current release, PYTHIA 8, have collectively been cited by more than 18,000 physics papers.

He has supervised nine PhD students at Lund University as main supervisor, more as co-supervisor. Notable students who remain active in the field include Peter Skands who graduated in 2004.

== Honours ==
In 1992 the Swedish Royal Academy of Science awarded him the Edlund prize,

for his foundational studies of how complex final states evolve out of elementary collision processes between elementary particles.

In 2012, the American Physical Society awarded him, together with Guido Altarelli and Bryan Webber, the J. J. Sakurai Prize for Theoretical Particle Physics,

for key ideas leading to the detailed confirmation of the Standard Model of particle physics, enabling high energy experiments to extract precise information about Quantum Chromodynamics, electroweak interactions and possible new physics.

In 2021, the European Physical Society awarded him, together with Bryan Webber, the High Energy and Particle Physics Prize,

for the conception, development and realisation of parton shower Monte Carlo simulations.
