= Ikaros Bigi =

German physicist (born 1947)

- Born: 27 August 1947 (age 79); Munich, Germany
- Education: LMU Munich
- Known for: CP violation B meson decays
- Awards: Mercator Visiting Professorship (2002); Sakurai Prize (2004)
- Scientific career
- Fields: Physicist
- Workplaces: Rockefeller University; Nagoya University; University of Notre Dame

Ikaros Bigi (born 27 August 1947) is a German theoretical physicist. His research focuses on refining the Standard Model phenomenology.

== Biography ==
Bigi graduated from Gymnasium Fridericianum, Erlangen, in 1967. Six years later, he received a Master from the Max-Planck-Institute for Physics, LMU Munich, where he stayed until 1977 to finish his PhD in Theoretical Physics. Since 1984, he is also a holder of Habilitation degree in Physics, acquired from RWTH Aachen University.

During his career, Bigi has been a research associate in many research teams in laboratories for Physics around the world. To summarize, some of them were SLAC (1973-1974), the Max Planck Institute for Physics in Munich (1975-1981), CERN (1978-1980), the Fermilab (1984). He has also been a visiting professor to universities over the U.S. and Europe, with duties currently being performed for the University of Notre Dame in Indiana.

Bigi has contributed to scientific journals as an author and reviewer. He is a member of international physics committees and organizations and has participated in seminars and conferences worldwide.

Bigi is married and has three children.

== Awards ==
Along with Anthony Ichiro Sanda, he was awarded the 2004 Sakurai Prize for his work on CP violation and B meson decays.
