= Alberto Sirlin =

Argentine theoretical physicist (1930–2022)

Alberto Sirlin (born 25 November 1930, in Buenos Aires, died February 23, 2022, in New York City) was an Argentine theoretical physicist, specializing in particle physics.

== Biography ==
Sirlin studied from 1948 to 1952 at the University of Buenos Aires, where he received his doctorate in 1953 under the supervision of Richard Gans. In 1953–1954 Sirlin was a fellow at the Centro Brasileiro de Pesquisas Físicas in Rio de Janeiro, where he took several graduate courses, including one taught by Richard Feynman. Sirlin was in 1954–1955 at the University of California at Los Angeles (UCLA) and in 1955–1957 at the Cornell University, where in 1958 he received a doctorate under the supervision of Tōichirō Kinoshita. From 1957 to 1959 he was a research assistant at Columbia University. At New York University he was from 1959 to 1961 an assistant professor, from 1961 to 1968 an associate professor, and from 1968 a full professor, retiring in 2008.

Sirlin did research in the 1950s on radiative corrections in the theory of muon decay, i.e. higher-order corrections in the allowed weak interactions of quantum electrodynamics (QED). In 1960 Sirlin and Ralph E. Behrends discovered the nonrenormalization theorem for partially conserved vector currents in the SU(2) theory of weak interactions and suggested the theorem's generalization to higher symmetry. Their theorem plays an important role in experimentally verifying predictions from the Cabibbo-Kobayashi-Maskawa matrix. Beginning in the 1970s Sirlin did research with his student William J. Marciano on higher-order corrections in leptonic decays. With Tsung-Dao Lee and Richard M. Friedberg, Sirlin did research on non-topological soliton solutions in quantum field theory.

Sirlin was elected a Fellow of the American Physical Society in 1971. He was in the academic year 1983–1984 a Guggenheim Fellow and in 1997 received the Alexander von Humboldt Award. In 2002 Sirlin and William J. Marciano received the Sakurai Prize for their collaborative research on the theory of electroweak interactions.

== Selected publications ==
- Beg, M A B.; Sirlin, A. (1974). "Gauge Theories of Weak Interactions (Circa 1973-74 C.E.)". Annual Review of Nuclear Science. 24: 379–450. Bibcode:1974ARNPS..24..379B. doi:10.1146/annurev.ns.24.120174.002115.
- with M. A. B. Beg: Gauge theories of weak interactions II. Physical Reports, Vol. 88, 1982, pp. 1–90 doi:10.1016/0370-1573(82)90100-4
- Current algebra formulation of radiation corrections in gauge theories and the universality of weak interactions. Reviews of Modern Physics, Vol. 50, 1978, pp. 573–605 doi:10.1103/RevModPhys.50.573
- Radiation corrections in the SU(2)_{L} × U(1) theory: A simple renormalization framework. Physical Review D, Vol. 22, 1980, pp. 971–981 doi:10.1103/PhysRevD.22.971
- The Standard Electroweak Model Circa 1994: A Brief Overview. Comments on Nuclear and Particle Physics Vol. 21, 1994, pp. 287–322.
