= Kenneth Lane (physicist) =

American physicist (1942–2026)

- Kenneth Lane at Harvard University, 2005
- Born: April 5, 1942; Binghamton, New York, U.S.
- Died: September 22, 2026 (aged 84); Brookline, Massachusetts, U.S.
- Education: Georgia Institute of Technology; Johns Hopkins University
- Known for: Technicolor; Charmonium; Cornell potential
- Awards: Sakurai Prize (2011)
- Scientific career
- Workplaces: Boston University
- Thesis: Chiral Symmetry Breaking and the K^{3} and K^{4} Form Factors (1970)
- Doctoral advisor: Chung Wook Kim

Kenneth Douglas Lane (April 5, 1942 – September 22, 2026) was an American theoretical particle physicist and academic who was a professor of physics at Boston University. Lane is best known for his role in the development of extended technicolor models of physics beyond the Standard Model.

== Life and career ==
Lane was born in Binghamton, New York on April 5, 1942. He received his B.Sc. and M.Sc. in physics at the Georgia Institute of Technology, and was a student of Chung Wook Kim at Johns Hopkins University, where he received his Ph.D. in 1970.

His physics research focused on the problems of electroweak and flavor symmetry breaking. With Estia J. Eichten, Lane co-invented extended technicolor. He and Eichten also contributed to early work on charmonium with Kurt Gottfried, Tom Kinoshita and Tung-Mow Yan.

In 1984 he coauthored "Supercollider Physics" (with Eichten, Ian Hinchliffe and Chris Quigg), which strongly influenced the quest for future discoveries at hadron colliders such as the Fermilab Tevatron the proposed but never completed SSC, and the LHC at CERN. In 2011 Dr Lane with Chris Quigg, Estia Eichten, and Ian Hinchliffe won the J. J. Sakurai Prize for Theoretical Particle Physics "For their work, separately and collectively, to chart a course of the exploration of TeV scale physics using multi-TeV hadron colliders".

He was elected a Fellow of the American Physical Society in 1990 "for original contributions to the theory of electroweak symmetry breaking and Supercollider physics".

Lane died at his home in Brookline, Massachusetts, on September 22, 2026, at the age of 84.
