= Bryan Webber =

British physicist

- Born: Bryan Ronald Webber; 25 July 1943 (age 83)
- Other name: B. R. Webber
- Education: Colston's School The Queen's College, Oxford (BA) University of California, Berkeley (PhD)
- Awards: Fellow of the Institute of Physics (1987); Fellow of the Royal Society (2001); IOP Dirac Medal (2008); Sakurai Prize (2012); High Energy and Particle Physics Prize (2021)
- Scientific career
- Fields: Particle physics Theoretical physics
- Workplaces: Lawrence Radiation Laboratory; Cavendish Laboratory
- Thesis: A test of the ΔS=ΔQ rule in leptonic decays of neutral K mesons (1969)

Bryan Ronald Webber, FRS, FInstP (born 25 July 1943) is a British physicist and academic. He was a Fellow of Emmanuel College, Cambridge from 1973 to 2010, and Professor of Theoretical Physics at the University of Cambridge from 1999 to 2010. He has been awarded the Dirac Medal by the Institute of Physics, the Sakurai Prize by the American Physical Society and the High Energy and Particle Physics Prize by the European Physical Society.

== Early life and education ==
Webber was born on 25 July 1943 to Frederick Ronald Webber and Iris Evelyn Webber (née Hutchings). He was educated at Colston's School, a private school in Bristol. He studied at The Queen's College, Oxford and graduated with a Bachelor of Arts (BA) degree in 1964. He then moved to California, United States, to undertake postgraduate research within the research group of Luis Walter Alvarez at the University of California, Berkeley. He completed his Doctor of Philosophy (PhD) degree in experimental particle physics in 1969 with a thesis titled A test of the ΔS=ΔQ rule in leptonic decays of neutral K mesons.

== Research and career ==
Webber began his academic career as a postdoctoral researcher at the Lawrence Radiation Laboratory, California. There, he researched strong interaction under Geoffrey Chew from 1969 to 1971. He then returned to England, where he joined the University of Cambridge as a research assistant. By 1973, he was the only member of staff researching particle physics theory, and was appointed head of the Theoretical High Energy Physics Group at the Cavendish Laboratory.

At university level, he was a demonstrator from 1973 to 1978. He was a lecturer from 1978 to 1994. He was promoted to reader in 1994. He was appointed Professor of Theoretical Physics in 1999. He retired in September 2010, and was appointed Professor Emeritus.

He was elected a Fellow of Emmanuel College, Cambridge in 1973. He was later made a professorial fellow. At various times, he was a tutor in physics and was a director of studies at Emmanuel College. On retirement in 2010, he was elected a Life Fellow.

== Honours and awards ==
In 1987, Webber was elected a Fellow of the Institute of Physics (FInstP). In 2001, he was elected a Fellow of the Royal Society (FRS).

In 2008, he was awarded the Dirac Medal by the Institute of Physics. The citation reads:

For his pioneering work in understanding and applying quantum chromodynamics (QCD), the theory of the strong interaction which is one of the three fundamental forces of Nature.

In 2012, he was awarded the J. J. Sakurai Prize for Theoretical Particle Physics by the American Physical Society. The citation reads:

For key ideas leading to the detailed confirmation of the Standard Model of particle physics, enabling high energy experiments to extract precise information about Quantum Chromodynamics, electroweak interactions and possible new physics.

In 2021, he was awarded the High Energy and Particle Physics Prize of the European Physical Society. The short citation reads:

For the conception, development and realisation of parton shower Monte Carlo simulations

He received the award together with Torbjörn Sjöstrand, who was also a co-recipient of the Sakurai Prize.

== Selected works ==
- Ellis, R. K.; Stirling, W. J.; Webber, B. R. (1996). QCD and collider physics. Cambridge: Cambridge University Press. ISBN 978-0521581899.
