= Anthony Ichiro Sanda =

Japanese-American particle physicist (born 1944)

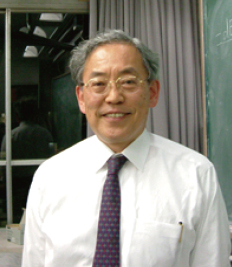
- Sanda in 2016
- Born: March 4, 1944 (age 82)
- Education: University of Illinois; Princeton University
- Known for: CP violation; B meson decays
- Awards: Nishina Memorial Prize (2002); Sakurai Prize (2004)
- Scientific career
- Fields: Physicist
- Workplaces: Rockefeller University; Nagoya University; Kanagawa University
- Doctoral advisor: John H. Schwarz

Anthony Ichiro Sanda (三田 一郎, Sanda Ichirō; born March 4, 1944) is a Japanese-American particle physicist. Along with Ikaros Bigi, he was awarded the 2004 Sakurai Prize for his work on CP violation and B meson decays.

== Academic life ==
Sanda studied at the University of Illinois (B.S. 1965) and Princeton University (Ph.D. 1969). He was a researcher at Columbia University from 1971 to 1974 and Fermi National Accelerator Laboratory. From 1974 to 1992, he was an Assistant Professor and then associate professor at Rockefeller University. From 1992, he was a professor of physics at Nagoya University. Since 2006, he is a Professor Emeritus at Nagoya University and a professor at Kanagawa University. Since 2007, he is also a Program Officer of the Kavli Institute for the Physics and Mathematics of the Universe, University of Tokyo. His major works are the proposal of a renormalizable gauge fixing method in broken gauge symmetric theory and the development of the theory of CP violations in B meson decays that has proven the Kobayashi-Maskawa Theory and has given a strong motivation for the experiments in Belle at KEK, Japan and BaBar at SLAC National Accelerator Laboratory, USA as well as fixing the necessary parameters of the accelerators to perform the experiments.

== Religious life ==
As a devout Roman Catholic, Sanda is an ordained permanent deacon at St. Mary's Cathedral in Tokyo. He is also the author of the book "As a Scientist, Why Do I Believe in God", which describes his relationship between physics and Christianity.

== Recognition ==
- Inoue Prize for Science (1993)
- Nishina Memorial Prize (1997)
- Chunichi Shimbun Prize (2002)
- Medal with Purple Ribbon (2002)
- Sakurai Prize (2004)
- Shuji Orito Prize (2015)
- St. Albert Award
