= PYTHIA =

Particle physics simulation program

PYTHIA is a computer simulation program for predicting events at very high energies in particle accelerators.

== History ==
PYTHIA was originally written in FORTRAN 77, until the 2007 release of PYTHIA 8.1 which was rewritten in C++. Both the Fortran and C++ versions were maintained until 2012 because not all components had been merged into the 8.1 version. However, the latest version already includes new features not available in the Fortran release. PYTHIA is developed and maintained by an international collaboration of physicists, consisting of Christian Bierlich, Nishita Desai, Leif Gellersen, Ilkka Helenius, Philip Ilten, Leif Lönnblad, Stephen Mrenna, Stefan Prestel, Christian Preuss, Torbjörn Sjöstrand, Peter Skands, Marius Utheim and Rob Verheyen.

== Features ==
The following is a list of some of the features PYTHIA is capable of simulating:

- Hard and soft interactions
- Parton distributions
- Initial/final-state parton showers
- Multiparton interactions
- Fragmentation and decay

== See also ==
- Particle physics
- Particle decay
