= Richard D. Field =

American professor of physics emeritus at University of Florida

- Born: Richard Dryden Field Jr. April 13, 1944 (age 82); Pasadena, California, U.S.
- Other name: Richard D. Field Jr.
- Education: University of California, Berkeley
- Mother: Margaret Field
- Relatives: Sally Field (sister); Peter Craig (nephew); Eli Craig (nephew)
- Scientific career
- Fields: Physics
- Workplaces: University of Florida
- Doctoral advisor: J. David Jackson
- Doctoral students: Stephen Wolfram

Richard Dryden Field Jr. (born April 13, 1944) is an emeritus professor of physics at the University of Florida in Gainesville, Florida. He is known particularly for his contributions to the phenomenology of particle production in high-energy particle accelerators.

== Education and personal life ==
Field was born in Pasadena, California, the son of actress Margaret Field and Richard Dryden Field, an Army officer. He was the stepson of actor/stuntman Jock Mahoney. His sister is Academy Award-winning actress Sally Field. Richard Field obtained his undergraduate education in physics at the University of California, Berkeley on a gymnastics scholarship, and continued with his PhD in 1971 under the supervision of John David Jackson.

== Research ==
Starting in 1971, he did post-doctoral work at Brookhaven National Laboratory. In 1973 he moved to California Institute of Technology to work with Nobel laureate Richard Feynman. It was there that he did his most-cited work, producing the "Field-Feynman" Monte Carlo used to compare the production of observable particles arising from the fragmentation of quarks and gluons in different particle accelerator environments. Two papers from this work, each with over 1000 citations, continue to be referenced as of 2021.

During this time he served as the PhD thesis advisor to computer-scientist/physicist Stephen Wolfram, who is CEO of Wolfram Research and was considered a physics prodigy in his student years. In 1980, Field moved to the University of Florida as a professor and, later, emeritus professor.

== Honors ==
He was elected a Fellow of the American Physical Society in 1987, "for contributions to the application of the Quantum Chromodynamic theory of quarks and gluons to hadron hadron collisions and the concept of parton fragmentation".
