= Sally Dawson =

American physicist

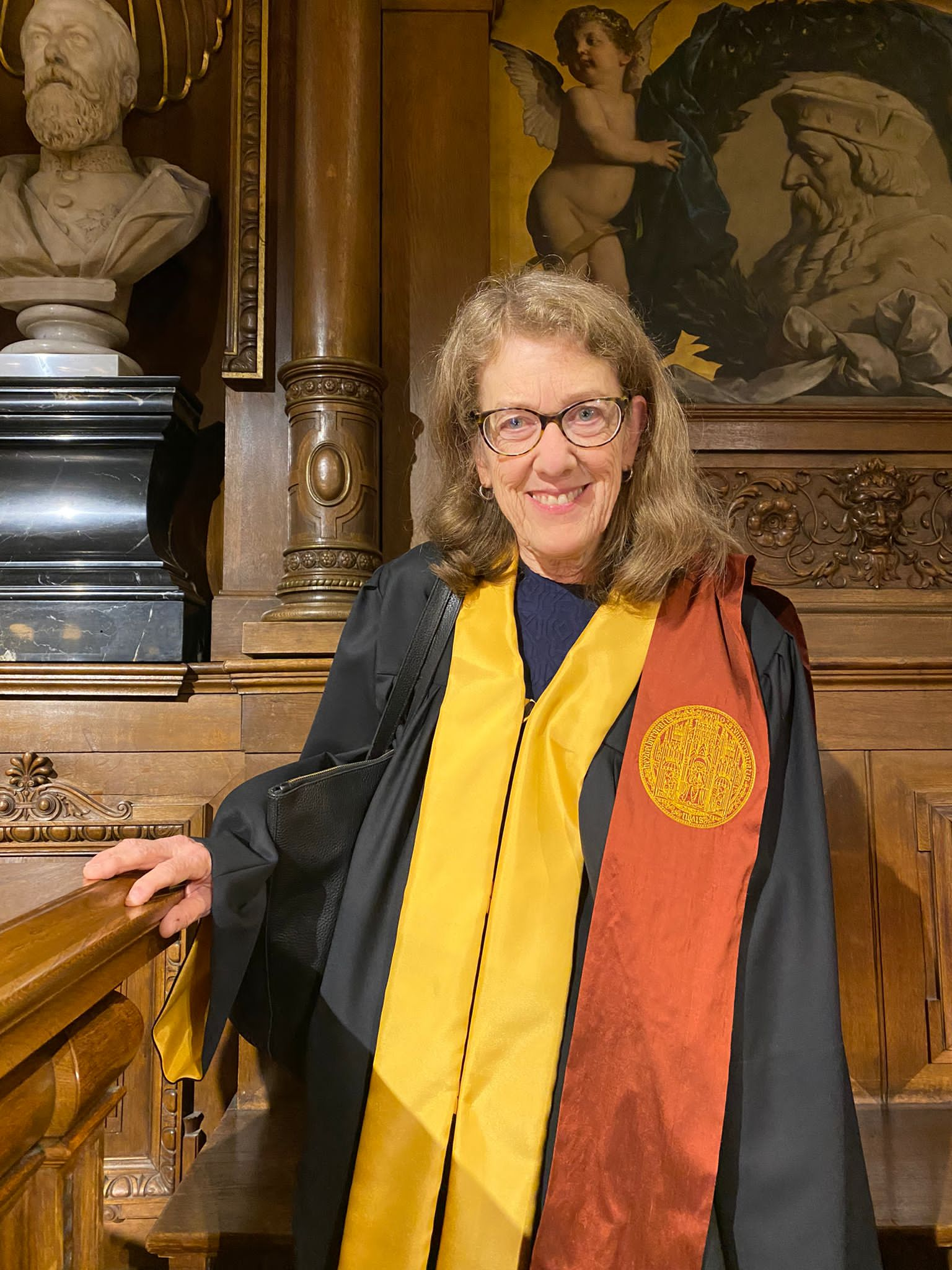
- Sally Dawson at Heidelberg University
- Education: Duke University; Harvard University
- Scientific career
- Workplaces: Fermilab Brookhaven National Laboratory Stony Brook University

Sally Dawson is an American physicist who deals with theoretical elementary particle physics.

== Education and career ==
Dawson studied mathematics and physics at Duke University with a bachelor's degree in 1977 and at Harvard University with a master's degree in 1978 and a doctorate in 1981 with thesis advisor Howard Georgi and thesis Radiative Corrections to sin^{2}θ_{W}. She was a postdoc at Fermilab (1983–1986) and Lawrence Berkeley National Laboratory (1981–1983). From 1986 she was at Brookhaven National Laboratory, where she became a senior scientist in 1994 and a group leader in 1998. From 2001 to the present, she is an adjunct professor at the C. N. Yang Institute for Theoretical Physics at Stony Brook University. In 2007–2008 she was on sabbatical leave at SLAC.

Her research deals with the physics of the Higgs boson and possible extensions of the Standard Model related to the Higgs boson. She co-authored, with three collaborators, an influential handbook, first published in 1990.

In 2004 Dawson was the chair of the Division of Particles and Fields of the American Physical Society. She was also the chair in 2006 of the Lawrence Berkeley National Laboratory Physics Division Program Review and in 2010 of the Fermilab Program Advisory Board.

In 2017 she, together with three collaborators, received the Sakurai Prize for, according to the laudation, "instrumental contributions to the theory of the properties, reactions, and signatures of the Higgs boson".

== Honors and awards ==
- 1995 — Town of Brookhaven, Woman of the Year in Science
- 1995 — elected a Fellow of the American Physical Society (APS)
- 1998 — APS Centennial Speaker
- 2006 — elected a Fellow of the American Association for the Advancement of Science
- 2015 — Humboldt Fellowship
- 2017 — Sakurai Prize of the APS

== Selected publications ==
- with John F. Gunion, Howard Haber, and Gordon L. Kane: The Higgs Hunter's Guide, Addison Wesley 1990, Westview Press 2000, CRC Press 2018
- as editor with Rabindra Nath Mohapatra: Colliders and neutrinos: the window into physics beyond the standard model. World Scientific. 2008. ISBN 9789812819253.
