= Method of virtual quanta =

Mathematical method

The method of virtual quanta is a method used to calculate radiation produced by interactions of electromagnetic particles, particularly in the case of bremsstrahlung. It can also be applied in the context of gravitational radiation, and more recently to other field theories by Carl Friedrich von Weizsäcker and Evan James Williams in 1934.

== Background ==
In problems of collision between charged particles or systems, the incident particle is often travelling at relativistic speeds when impacting the struck system, producing the field of a moving charge as follows:

$E_1 = -\frac{q \gamma v t}{(b^2 + \gamma^2 v^2 t^2)^{\frac{3}{2}}}$

$E_2 = \frac{q \gamma b}{(b^2 + \gamma^2 v^2 t^2)^{\frac{3}{2}}}$

$B_3 = \frac{v}{c} E_2$

where $E_1$ indicates the component of the electric field in the direction of travel of the particle, $E_2$ indicates the E-field in the direction perpendicular to $E_1$ and in the plane of the collision, $b$ is the impact parameter, $\gamma$ is the Lorentz factor, $q$ the charge and $v$ the velocity of the incident particle.

In the ultrarelativistic limit, $E_2$ and $B_3$ have the form of a pulse of radiation travelling in the $\overrightarrow{e_1}$ direction. This creates the virtual radiation pulse (virtual quanta) denoted by $P_1$. Moreover, an additional magnetic field may be added in order to turn $E_1$ into a radiation pulse travelling along $\overrightarrow{e_2}$, denoted $P_2$. This virtual magnetic field will turn out to be much smaller than $B_3$, hence its contribution to the motion of particles is minimal.

By taking this point of view, the problem of the collision can be treated as a scattering of radiation. Similar analogies can be made for other processes (e.g. the ionisation of an atom by a fast electron can be treated as photoexcitation).

== Bremsstrahlung ==
In the case of bremsstrahlung, the problem becomes one of the scattering of the virtual quanta in the nuclear Coulomb potential. This is a standard problem and the cross section of the scattering is known as the Thomson cross section:

$\frac{d\sigma}{d\Omega} = \frac{1}{2}\left(\frac{z^2 e^2}{mc^2}\right)^2(1+\cos^2{\theta})$

The differential radiation cross section per unit frequency is hence:

$\frac{d\chi}{d\omega d\Omega} = \frac{1}{2}\left(\frac{z^2 e^2}{mc^2}\right)^2(1+\cos^2{\theta})\frac{dI}{d\omega}$

where $\frac{dI}{d\omega}$ is the frequency spectrum of virtual quanta produced by the incident particle over all possible impact parameters.

== Other applications ==
=== Synchrotron radiation ===
In the rest frame of the charged accelerating particle, the emission of synchrotron radiation can be treated as a Thomson scattering problem. This enables the introduction of various corrections into the classical calculation of the power lost by particles while accelerated, such as the quantum correction through the Klein-Nishina formula.

=== Gravitational radiation ===
When transforming the gravitational field described by the Schwarzschild metric into the rest frame of a passing, relativistic test particle, an effect similar to the relativistic transformation of electric and magnetic fields is observed, and virtual pulses of gravitational radiation are produced. Through this, the cross section of close gravitational encounters and radiative power loss caused by such collisions can be calculated.

== Bibliography ==
- Jackson, John David (1999). Classical Electrodynamics (3rd ed.). John Wiley & Sons. ISBN 0-471-30932-X.
