= Dirac Medal (IOP) =

Prize awarded by the Institute of Physics

The Paul Dirac Medal and Prize is a gold medal awarded annually by the Institute of Physics (Britain's and Ireland's main professional body for physicists) for "outstanding contributions to theoretical (including mathematical and computational) physics". The award, which includes a £1000 prize, was decided upon by the Institute of Physics in 1985, and first granted in 1987.

== Recipients ==
Year	Name	Institution	For
1987	Stephen Hawking		
1988	John Stewart Bell		
1989	Roger Penrose		
1990	Michael Berry		
1991	Rudolf Peierls		
1992	Anthony Leggett		
1993	David Thouless		
1994	Volker Heine		
1995	Daniel Frank Walls		
1996	John Pendry		
1997	Peter Higgs		
1998	David Deutsch	University of Oxford	his pioneering work in quantum computation leading to the concept of a quantum computer and for contributing to the understanding of how such devices might be constructed from quantum logic gates in quantum networks.
1999	Ian C. Percival	Queen Mary and Westfield College	his distinguished contributions to the interpretation of quantum theory, to quantum and classical dynamical chaos, and to atomic and molecular theory
2000	John Cardy	University of Oxford	his seminal contributions to statistical mechanics. In particular, he is recognized for his application of field theoretical and conformal invariance methods to the study of critical behaviour, considerations of the effects of quenched disorder, integrable systems and non-equilibrium critical phenomena.
2001	Brian Ridley	University of Essex	his profound influence on semiconductor theory stretching over four decades
2002	John Hannay	University of Bristol	outstanding contribution to theoretical physics in the areas of quantum mechanics, classical mechanics, and optics
2003	Christopher Hull	Queen Mary University of London	pioneering work in super-string theory.
2004	Michael Green	University of Cambridge	crucial role in the development of superstring theory as a credible new framework for physics
2005	John Ellis	CERN	his highly influential work on particle physics phenomenology; in particular on the properties of gluons, the Higgs boson and the top quark.
2006	Mike Gillan	University College London	his contributions to the development of atomic-scale computer simulations, which have greatly extended their power and effectiveness across an immense range of applications.
2007	David Sherrington	University of Oxford	his pioneering work in spin glasses.
2008	Bryan Webber	University of Cambridge	his pioneering work in understanding and applying quantum chromodynamics (QCD), the theory of the strong interaction which is one of the three fundamental forces of Nature.
2009	Michael Cates	University of Edinburgh	pioneering work in the theoretical physics of soft materials, particularly in relation to their flow behaviour.
2010	James Binney	University of Oxford	his contribution to our understanding of how galaxies are constituted, how they work and how they were formed.
2011	Christopher Isham	Imperial College London	his major contributions to the search for a consistent quantum theory of gravity and to the foundations of quantum mechanics.
2012	Graham Garland Ross	University of Oxford	his theoretical work in developing both the Standard Model of fundamental particles and forces and theories beyond the Standard Model that have led to many new insights into the origins and nature of the universe.
2013	Stephen M. Barnett	University of Strathclyde	his wide ranging contributions throughout optics research, which both inspire and lead experimental endeavours.
2014	Tim Palmer	University of Oxford	the development of probabilistic weather and climate prediction systems.
2015	John Barrow	University of Cambridge	his combination of mathematical and physical reasoning to increase our understanding of the evolution of the universe, and his use of cosmology to increase our understanding of fundamental physics.
2016	Sandu Popescu	University of Bristol	his fundamental and influential research into nonlocality and his contribution to the foundations of quantum physics.
2017	Michael Duff	Imperial College London and Oxford University	sustained groundbreaking contributions to theoretical physics including the discovery of Weyl anomalies, for having pioneered Kaluza-Klein supergravity, and for recognising that superstrings in 10 dimensions are merely a special case of membranes in an 11-dimensional M-theory.
2018	John Chalker	University of Oxford	his pioneering, deep, and distinctive contributions to condensed-matter theory, particularly in the quantum Hall effect, and to geometrically frustrated magnets.
2019	Richard Keith Ellis	University of Durham	his seminal work in quantum chromodynamics (QCD) where he performed many of the key calculations that led to the acceptance of QCD as the correct theory of the strong interaction.
2020	Carlos Frenk	University of Durham	outstanding contributions to establishing the current standard model for the formation of all cosmic structure, and for leading computational cosmology within the UK for more than three decades.
2021	Steven Balbus	University of Oxford	fundamental contributions to the theory of accretion-disc turbulence and the dynamical stability of astrophysical fluids, breaking new ground by establishing the critical role played by weak magnetic fields.
2022	Michael William Finnis	Imperial College London	opening entire areas of materials physics to rigorous theory and atomic-scale computation, including atomic interactions, irradiation damage, metal–ceramic interfaces, grain boundary embrittlement and ab initio thermodynamics of open systems.
2023	Gavin Salam	University of Oxford	profound, wide-ranging and impactful contributions to particle physics, especially those concerning the identification and structure of hadronic jets.
2025	Julia Mary Yeomans	University of Oxford	contributions to understanding the collective behaviour of active particles, and work highlighting the relevance of active physics to living matter.

== See also ==
- List of physics awards
- List of awards named after people
