= R. Keith Ellis =

British theoretical physicist (born 1949)

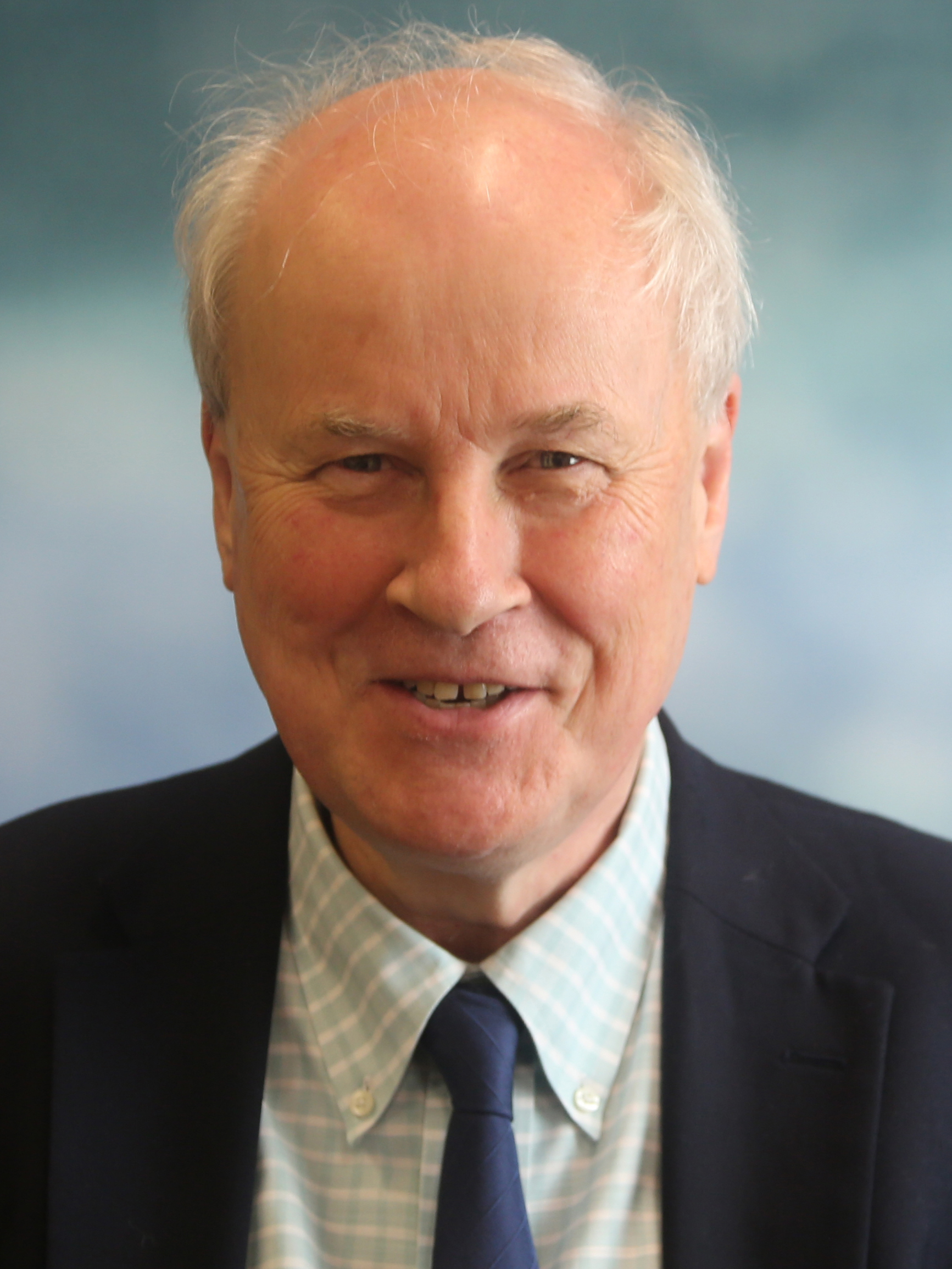
- Ellis in 2019
- Born: Richard Keith Ellis; 17 November 1949 (age 76); Aberdeen, Scotland
- Education: University of Oxford; New College, Oxford; Wadham College, Oxford
- Known for: Quantum chromodynamics; Collider phenomenology
- Awards: Sakurai Prize (2009); FRS (2009); Dirac Medal of the IOP (2019)
- Scientific career
- Workplaces: University of Durham
- Doctoral advisors: Guido Altarelli; Luciano Maiani
- Website: www.ippp.dur.ac.uk/profile/ellis

Richard Keith Ellis, FRS (born 17 November 1949) is a British theoretical physicist, working at the University of Durham, and a leading authority on perturbative quantum chromodynamics and collider phenomenology.

== Education ==
Ellis graduated from the University of Oxford (MA 1971, D.Phil. 1974). He has held positions at Imperial College, MIT, Caltech, CERN and the University of Rome.

== Career and research ==
Ellis went to Fermilab in 1984 and was Head of the Theoretical Physics Department there from 1993 to 2004. In 2015 he moved to the University of Durham in the UK, where he was a professor of Physics and Director of the Institute for Particle Physics Phenomenology until the end of 2019.

Ellis' work is of importance to the study of elementary particles at colliders, such as the Fermilab Tevatron, and the CERN Large Hadron Collider. Ellis has contributed in a substantial way to the interpretation of experiments performed at high energy. Together with Douglas Ross and Tony Terrano he performed the first calculation of jet structure in e+e- annihilation which allowed precise determination of the strong coupling. In addition, with Guido Altarelli and Guido Martinelli he performed a calculation of lepton pair production which allow reconciliation of observed rates with theoretical calculations. He has also co-authored a number of widely read papers on the theory of heavy quark production. He is also co-author for the parton-level Monte Carlo program MCFM.

Ellis is the coauthor with W. J. Stirling and B. R. Webber of a book on QCD and collider physics published by Cambridge University Press in 1996.

== Honours and awards ==
Ellis was elected a Fellow of the American Physical Society in 1988 and a Fellow of the Royal Society of London in 2009. Also in 2009, Ellis together with John Collins and Davison Soper won the J. J. Sakurai Prize for Theoretical Particle Physics, For work in perturbative Quantum Chromodynamics, including applications to problems pivotal to the interpretation of high energy particle collisions. In 2019 he was awarded the Paul Dirac Medal of the Institute of Physics, For his seminal work in quantum chromodynamics (QCD) where he performed many of the key calculations that led to the acceptance of QCD as the correct theory of the strong interaction.
