= Howard E. Haber =

American physicist

Howard Eli Haber (born 3 February 1952 in Brooklyn, New York City) is an American physicist, specializing in theoretical elementary particle physics.

Howard Haber received in 1973 his bachelor's degree and master's degree from Massachusetts Institute of Technology (MIT) and received in 1978 his Ph.D. from the University of Michigan at Ann Arbor. He was a postdoc at the Lawrence Berkeley National Laboratory from 1978 to 1980 and at the University of Pennsylvania from 1980 to 1982. He joined the faculty of the physics department and the University of California, Santa Cruz, where he became an associate professor in 1989 and a full professor in 1990 (continuing to the present). From 1982 to the present he has been a visiting physicist with the Theory Group at SLAC.

From 1985 to 1988 Haber held an Outstanding Junior Investigator Award from DOE. In 1993 he was elected a Fellow of the American Physical Society. In 2009 he received a Humboldt Research Award, with which he was a visiting professor at the University of Bonn.

His research deals with the physics of the Higgs boson and also possible Standard Model extensions such as the low-energy sector of supersymmetry theory, which he considers fundamental for the study of physics beyond the Standard Model.

In 2017 he, together with three collaborators, received the Sakurai Prize for, according to the laudation, "instrumental contributions to the theory of the properties, reactions, and signatures of the Higgs boson".

== Selected publications ==
- with John F. Gunion, Gordon L. Kane, Sally Dawson: The Higgs Hunter's Guide, Addison Wesley 1990, Westview Press 2000, CRC Press 2018
