= Cornell potential =

Simple potential between quarks

In particle physics, the Cornell potential is an effective method to account for the confinement of quarks in quantum chromodynamics (QCD). It was developed by Estia J. Eichten, Kurt Gottfried, Toichiro Kinoshita, John Kogut, Kenneth Lane and Tung-Mow Yan at Cornell University in the 1970s to explain the masses of quarkonium states and account for the relation between the mass and angular momentum of the hadron (the so-called Regge trajectories). The potential has the form:

$$V(r) = -\frac{4}{3}\frac{\alpha_V(r)}{\;r\;} + \sigma\,r + \text{constant}$$

where $r$ is the effective radius of the quarkonium state, $\alpha_V$ is a coupling dependent on the hadron being studied, and is related to the QCD running coupling, $\sigma$ is the QCD string tension and is a constant of $\simeq 0.18 GeV^2$. Initially, $\alpha_s$ and $\sigma$ were merely empirical parameters but with the development of QCD can now be calculated using perturbative QCD and lattice QCD, respectively.

== Short distance potential ==
The potential consists of two parts. The first one, $-\frac{4}{3}\frac{\alpha_s}{\;r\;}$ dominate at short distances, typically for $r <0.1$ fm. It arises from the one-gluon exchange between the quark and its anti-quark, and is known as the Coulombic part of the potential, since it has the same form as the well-known Coulombic potential $\;\frac{\alpha}{\;r\;}\;$ induced by the electromagnetic force (where $\alpha$ is the electromagnetic coupling constant).

The factor $\frac{4}{3}$ in QCD comes from the fact that quarks have different type of charges (colors) and is associated with any gluon emission from a quark. Specifically, this factor is called the color factor or Casimir factor and is $C_F \equiv \frac{N_c^2-1}{2N_c}= \frac{4}{3}$, where $N_c = 3$ is the number of color charges.

The value for $\alpha_s$ depends on the radius of the studied hadron. Its value ranges from 0.19 to 0.4. For precise determination of the short distance potential, the running of $\alpha_s$ must be accounted for, resulting in a distant-dependent $\alpha_s(r)$. Specifically, $\alpha_s$ must be calculated in the so-called potential renormalization scheme (also denoted V-scheme) and, since quantum field theory calculations are usually done in momentum space, Fourier transformed to position space.

== Long distance potential ==
The second term of the potential, $\sigma\,r$, is the linear confinement term and fold-in the non-perturbative QCD effects that result in color confinement. $\sigma$ is interpreted as the tension of the QCD string that forms when the gluonic field lines collapse into a flux tube. Its value is $\sigma \sim 0.18$ GeV$^2$. $\sigma$ controls the intercepts and slopes of the linear Regge trajectories.

== Domains of application ==
The Cornell potential applies best for the case of static quarks (or very heavy quarks with non-relativistic motion), although relativistic improvements to the potential using speed-dependent terms are available. Likewise, the potential has been extended to include spin-dependent terms

== Calculation of the quark-quark potential ==
A test of validity for approaches that seek to explain color confinement is that they must produce, in the limit that quark motions are non-relativistic, a potential that agrees with the Cornell potential.

A significant achievement of lattice QCD is to be able compute from first principles the static quark-antiquark potential, with results confirming the empirical Cornell Potential.

Other approaches to the confinement problem also results in the Cornell potential, including the dual superconductor model, the Abelian Higgs model, and the center vortex models.

More recently, calculations based on the AdS/CFT correspondence have reproduced the Cornell potential using the AdS/QCD correspondence or light front holography.

== See also ==
- Color confinement
- QCD vacuum
