= Kellogg Stelle =

American-British physicist (1948–2025)

Kellogg S. "Kelly" Stelle (11 March 1948–23 October 2025). was an American-British theoretical physicist and professor of physics at Imperial College London. His work was focused on the theory of gravitation, in particular quantum gravity, and braneworld cosmology.

He developed the theory of quadratic gravity in 1977. The theory had difficulty being accepted as a viable theory because it postulates the existence of a massive ghost particle. He later turned his interest to supergravity.

A two-day scientific conference, "Kellyfest", to celebrate his 60th birthday was held by the Theoretical Physics Group at Imperial College in 2008.

He was a Fellow of the Institute of Physics and of the American Physical Society. He was a winner of a Humboldt Research Award in 2006, and of the John William Strutt, Lord Rayleigh Medal and Prize in 2020.

He died in 2025.
