= Arkady Tseytlin =

Russian-British theoretical physicist

Arkady Alexander Tseytlin FRS (Аркадий Александрович Цейтлин; born August 31, 1956, in Moscow) is a Russian and British theoretical physicist. He works on superstring theory and the AdS/CFT correspondence.

Tseytlin graduated from Moscow State University with Master degree in physics in 1979. In 1984, he obtained his PhD from Lebedev Physical Institute (under the supervision of E. S. Fradkin) and joined the academic staff there. Since 1992, he has been a professor at Imperial College London.

Tseytlin has made important contributions to the development of modern string theory. In particular, he, with E. S. Fradkin, developed the sigma-model approach to string dynamics in curved spacetime and established the central role of the Born-Infeld action in the open string theory. He also constructed, with R. R. Metsaev, a superstring action in anti-de Sitter space, which plays a central role in the duality between gauge fields and strings and underlies the exact solution of the N=4 supersymmetric Yang-Mills theory based on integrability.

In 2011, Tseytlin was awarded the Rayleigh Medal and Prize of the UK-based Institute of Physics. In 2023, he was awarded the International Pomeranchuk Prize. In 2025, he was elected a Fellow of the Royal Society of the UK.
