= Nikolaos Mavromatos =

Greek theoretical physicist (born 1961)

Nikolaos Emmanuel Mavromatos (Greek: Νικόλαος Εμμανουήλ Μαυρομάτος; born 15 November 1961, Athens) is a Greek theoretical physicist, specialising in string theory, particle physics, and cosmology. He has an international reputation for his research on quantum spacetimes, uncertainty relations in string theory, and ideas for tests of possible violations of Lorentz invariance and CPT invariance.

== Education and career ==
In 1979, Mavromatos entered the School of Physical Sciences of the National and Kapodistrian University of Athens (abbr. NKUA or UoA), where he graduated in 1983 with a B.Sc. in physics. His bachelor's dissertation was supervised by Christos Nicholas Ktorides. For the academic year 1983–1984 Mavromatos collaborated with Ktorides on extension and completion of original research from the B.Sc. dissertation. During his undergraduate study, Mavromatos learned quantum theory from Fokion T. Hadjioannou and developed collaborative friendships with G. A. Diamandas and B. C. Georgalas. From 1984 to 1987 Mavromatos studied theoretical particle physics at the University of Oxford. His doctoral dissertation Aspects of the low energy limit of string theories was supervised by Christopher Llewellyn Smith and M. Daniel. From 1985 to 1987 Mavromatos was supported by a Domus Graduate Scholarship for study at Linacre College, Oxford. From 1987 to 1990, he was a Junior Research Fellow of Hertford College, Oxford. At CERN, he was from October 1990 to December 1992 a Theory Division Research Associate and from January 1993 to 1995 a Scientific Associate. From 1995 to 1999, he held a junior faculty post as an Advanced Research Fellow of the Particle Physics and Astronomy Research Council in the physics department of the University of Oxford. Since 1999, Mavromatos has held tenure as a professor of theoretical physics at King's College London. He has been on academic leave several times for visiting professorships in Spain and Greece. He has been an invited speaker and has chaired sessions in many international conferences. Since 2005, he has advised the Greek Government on the cooperation of Greece with CERN.

== Research ==
Mavromatos is the author or coauthor of more than 260 scientific articles. His research in cosmology and theoretical particle physics, includes astroparticle physics, exotic quantum phases, and string theory He is a pioneer of exploring in mathematical physics the properties of quantum spacetimes and proposing tests of Lorentz invariance by using intense extragalactic light sources to confirm, or disconfirm, hypotheses about quantum spacetimes. He and his collaborators used string models for mathematical developments of how quantum gravity might modify the optical properties of the quantum vacuum. Mavromatos is credited as the originator of the idea that time in non-critical string theory might result from violation of conformal symmetries found in string theory. He mathematically demonstrated that such hypothetical violations of conformal symmetries might be linked to spacetime defects involving theories of quantum gravity. He used string-theoretical uncertainty relations to show that hypothetical Lorentz-invariance violation (LIV) associated with violation of conformal symmetries might imply that LIV could be detected using photons emitted from gamma ray bursts or active galactic nuclei. The LIV would be indicated by delays involving variations of photon velocity depending upon the energy of the photons. Photon propagation in the quantum vacuum might have properties analogous to ocean wave propagation in rough seas. Mavromatos and his coworkers have placed limits on LIV and suggested tests of the quantum universe using astrophysical data. The 1998 paper Tests of quantum gravity from observations of γ-ray bursts by Giovanni Amelino-Camelia, John Ellis, Nikolaos Mavromatos, Dimitri Nanopoulos, and Subir Sarkar has more 1700 citations. With John Ellis, Dimitri Nanopoulos, and other collaborators, Mavromatos suggested possible tests of the constancy of the velocity of light and possible optical properties of the vacuum related to D-branes. Mavromatos coauthored an experimental paper with the MAGIC Collaboration and a highly cited experimental paper with the CPLEAR Collaboration In the 2020s, he with collaborators, using LIGO, embarked on studies of possible modified dispersion relations of photons and gravitons.

== Awards and honours ==
For essays written with John Ellis and Dimitri Nanopoulos and based on quantum gravity research, Nikolaos Mavromatos shared the first prize for the 1999 and 2005 essay competitions of the Gravity Research Foundation. The 1999 and 2005 prizes were for essays on phenomenology of quantum gravity and string cosmology, respectively. Mavromatos was elected in April 2004 a Fellow of the Institute of Physics. In 2023, he was awarded the John William Strutt, Lord Rayleigh Medal and Prize of the Institute of Physics.

== Selected publications ==
=== Book chapters ===
- Nick E. Mavromatos (2001). "Chapter. Testing a (Stringy) Model of Quantum Gravity". In H. V. Klapdor-Kleingrothaus; R.D. Viollier (eds.). Dark Matter in Astro- and Particle Physics: Proceedings of the International Conference DARK 2000 Heidelberg, Germany, 10–14 July 2000. Springer. pp. 209–233. doi:10.1007/978-3-642-56643-1_21. ISBN 978-3-642-62608-1.
- Nick Mavromatos (2007). "Chapter. The Issue of Dark Energy in String Theory". In Papantonopoulos, L. (ed.). The Invisible Universe: Dark Matter and Dark Energy. Lecture Notes in Physics. Vol. 720. pp. 333–374. doi:10.1007/978-3-540-71013-4_12. ISBN 978-3-540-71012-7.

=== Journal articles ===
- Dorey, N.; Mavromatos, N.E. (1992). "QED_{3} and two-dimensional superconductivity without parity violation". Nuclear Physics B. 386 (3): 614–680. Bibcode:1992NuPhB.386..614D. doi:10.1016/0550-3213(92)90632-L.
- Ellis, John; Mavromatos, N.E.; Nanopoulos, D.V. (1992). "String theory modifies quantum mechanics". Physics Letters B. 293 (1–2): 37–48. arXiv:hep-th/9207103. Bibcode:1992PhLB..293...37E. doi:10.1016/0370-2693(92)91478-R.
- Kanti, P.; Mavromatos, N. E.; Rizos, J.; Tamvakis, K.; Winstanley, E. (1996). "Dilatonic black holes in higher curvature string gravity". Physical Review D. 54 (8): 5049–5058. arXiv:hep-th/9511071. Bibcode:1996PhRvD..54.5049K. doi:10.1103/PhysRevD.54.5049. PMID 10021194.
- Amelino-Camelia, G.; Ellis, John; Mavromatos, N. E.; Nanopoulos, D. V. (1997). "Distance Measurement and Wave Dispersion in a Liouville-String Approach to Quantum Gravity". International Journal of Modern Physics A. 12 (3): 607–623. arXiv:hep-th/9605211. Bibcode:1997IJMPA..12..607A. doi:10.1142/S0217751X97000566.
- Amelino-Camelia, G.; Ellis, John; Mavromatos, N. E.; Nanopoulos, D. V.; Sarkar, Subir (1998). "Tests of quantum gravity from observations of γ-ray bursts". Nature. 393 (6687): 763–765. arXiv:astro-ph/9712103. Bibcode:1998Natur.393..763A. doi:10.1038/31647.
- Mavromatos, Nick E.; Rizos, John (2000). "String-inspired higher-curvature terms and the Randall-Sundrum scenario". Physical Review D. 62 (12) 124004. arXiv:hep-th/0008074. Bibcode:2000PhRvD..62l4004M. doi:10.1103/PhysRevD.62.124004.
- Ellis, John; Mavromatos, N.E.; Nanopoulos, D.V.; Sakharov, A.S.; Sarkisyan, E.K.G. (2006). "Robust limits on Lorentz violation from gamma-ray bursts". Astroparticle Physics. 25 (6): 402–411. arXiv:astro-ph/0510172. Bibcode:2006APh....25..402E. doi:10.1016/j.astropartphys.2006.04.001. 2006
- Ellis, John; Mavromatos, Nick E.; You, Tevong (2017). "Light-by-Light Scattering Constraint on Born-Infeld Theory". Physical Review Letters. 118 (26) 261802. arXiv:1703.08450. Bibcode:2017PhRvL.118z1802E. doi:10.1103/PhysRevLett.118.261802. PMID 28707927.
- Basilakos, Spyros; Mavromatos, Nick E.; Solà Peracaula, Joan (2020). "Gravitational and chiral anomalies in the running vacuum universe and matter-antimatter asymmetry". Physical Review D. 101 (4) 045001. arXiv:1907.04890. Bibcode:2020PhRvD.101d5001B. doi:10.1103/PhysRevD.101.045001.
