= Sakurai Prize =

Award in theoretical particle physics

J. J. Sakurai Prize for Theoretical Particle Physics
- Awarded for: outstanding achievement in particle theory
- Country: United States
- Presented by: American Physical Society
- Reward: US$10,000
- First award: 1985
- Website: www.aps.org/funding-recognition/prize/sakurai-prize

The J. J. Sakurai Prize for Theoretical Particle Physics, also commonly referred to as just the Sakurai Prize, is a prize awarded by the American Physical Society. It is presented annually at the Society's April meeting and honors "outstanding achievement in particle theory".

The award was established in November 1984 with an endowment fund provided by the family and friends of physicist Jun John Sakurai, who had died in October 1982 during a visit to CERN. Currently, the prize consists of a US$10,000 cash award, an allowance for the recipient to travel to the ceremony, and a certificate citing their contributions. From its inaugural edition until 2008, the prize's cash award was $5,000.

The Sakurai Prize is administered by the Society's Division of Particles and Fields, and winners are chosen by a selection committee. The prize may be shared by multiple people. The inaugural recipients, Toshihide Maskawa and Makoto Kobayashi, were awarded the prize in 1985 for their work on the electroweak interaction. The first woman to receive the Sakurai Prize was Mary K. Gaillard in 1993.

== Recipients ==
Sakurai Prize recipients and rationale
Year	Image	Recipients	Rationale
1985	Toshihide Maskawa in 2008	Toshihide Maskawa	"For their contributions to the theory of electroweak interactions through their general formulation of fermion mass matrix and their prescient inference of the existence of more than four flavors of quarks."
1985	Makoto Kobayashi in 2008	Makoto Kobayashi	"For their contributions to the theory of electroweak interactions through their general formulation of fermion mass matrix and their prescient inference of the existence of more than four flavors of quarks."
1986	David Gross in 2007	David Gross	"For their analyses of nonabelian gauge theories at short distances, and the implications of these insights for the understanding of the strong interaction between quarks."
1986	–	H. David Politzer	"For their analyses of nonabelian gauge theories at short distances, and the implications of these insights for the understanding of the strong interaction between quarks."
1986	Frank Wilczek in 2004	Frank Wilczek	"For their analyses of nonabelian gauge theories at short distances, and the implications of these insights for the understanding of the strong interaction between quarks."
1987	Luciano Maiani in 1996	Luciano Maiani	"For their work on the weak interactions of charmed particles, a crucial step in the development of the modern theory of the fundamental interactions."
1987	Jean Iliopolous in 2009	John Iliopoulos	"For their work on the weak interactions of charmed particles, a crucial step in the development of the modern theory of the fundamental interactions."
1988	–	Stephen L. Adler	For his work in elucidating the consequences of chiral symmetry through sum rules and low energy theorems."
1989	Nicola Cabibbo in 2006	Nicola Cabibbo	"For his outstanding contribution in elucidating the structure of the hadronic weak current."
1990	–	Toichiro Kinoshita	"For his theoretical contributions to precision tests of quantum electrodynamics and the electroweak theory, especially his pioneering work on the computation of the lepton anomalous magnetic moments."
1991	Vladimir Gribov in 1990	Vladimir N. Gribov	"For his early pioneering work on the high energy behavior of quantum field theories and his elucidating studies of the global structure of non-abelian gauge theories."
1992	–	Lincoln Wolfenstein	"For his many contributions to the theory of weak interactions, particularly CP violation and the properties of neutrinos."
1993	Mary Gaillard in 2015	Mary K. Gaillard	"For contributions to particle physics phenomenology and theory, and in particular for her work with Ben Lee and others applying QCD to K meson mixing and decays and to the bound states of charmed quarks."
1994	Yoichiro Nambu in 2005	Yoichiro Nambu	"For his many fundamental contributions to field theory and particle physics, including the understanding of the pion as the signaler of spontaneous breaking of chiral symmetry."
1995	–	Howard Georgi	"For his pioneering contributions toward the unification of strong and electroweak interactions, and for his application of quantum chromodynamics to the properties and interactions of hadrons."
1996	William Allan Bardeen	William Allan Bardeen	"For fundamental insights into the structure and meaning of the axial anomaly and for contributions to the understanding of perturbative quantum chromodynamics."
1997	Thomas Applequist	Thomas Appelquist	"For his pioneering work on charmonium and on the de-coupling of heavy particles."
1998	Leonard Susskind in 2013	Leonard Susskind	"For his pioneering contributions to hadronic string models, lattice gauge theories, quantum chromodynamics, and dynamical symmetry breaking."
1999	Mikhail Shifman in 2012	Mikhail Shifman	"For fundamental contributions to the understanding of non-perturbative QCD, non-leptonic weak decays, and the analytic properties of supersymmetric gauge theories."
1999	–	Arkady Vainshtein	"For fundamental contributions to the understanding of non-perturbative QCD, non-leptonic weak decays, and the analytic properties of supersymmetric gauge theories."
1999	–	Valentin Ivanovich Zakharov	"For fundamental contributions to the understanding of non-perturbative QCD, non-leptonic weak decays, and the analytic properties of supersymmetric gauge theories."
2000	Curtis Callan in 1986	Curtis G. Callan	"For his classic formulation of the renormalization group, his contributions to instanton physics and to the theory of monopoles and strings."
2001	Nathan Isgur	Nathan Isgur	"For the construction of the heavy quark mass expansion and the discovery of the heavy quark symmetry in quantum chromodynamics, which led to a quantitative theory of the decays of c and b flavored hadrons."
2001	–	Mikhail Voloshin	"For the construction of the heavy quark mass expansion and the discovery of the heavy quark symmetry in quantum chromodynamics, which led to a quantitative theory of the decays of c and b flavored hadrons."
2001	–	Mark Wise	"For the construction of the heavy quark mass expansion and the discovery of the heavy quark symmetry in quantum chromodynamics, which led to a quantitative theory of the decays of c and b flavored hadrons."
2002	–	Alberto Sirlin	"For their pioneering work on radiative corrections, which made precision electroweak studies a powerful method of probing the Standard Model and searching for new physics."
2002	–	William J. Marciano	"For their pioneering work on radiative corrections, which made precision electroweak studies a powerful method of probing the Standard Model and searching for new physics."
2003	–	Alfred Mueller	"For developing concepts and techniques in QCD, such as infrared safety and factorization in hard processes, which permitted precise quantitative predictions and experimental tests, and thereby helped to establish QCD as the theory of the strong interactions."
2003	–	George Sterman	"For developing concepts and techniques in QCD, such as infrared safety and factorization in hard processes, which permitted precise quantitative predictions and experimental tests, and thereby helped to establish QCD as the theory of the strong interactions."
2004	–	Ikaros I. Bigi	"For pioneering theoretical insights that pointed the way to the very fruitful experimental study of CP violation in B decays, and for continuing contributions to the fields of CP and heavy flavor physics."
2004	Anthony Ichiro Sanda	Anthony Sanda	"For pioneering theoretical insights that pointed the way to the very fruitful experimental study of CP violation in B decays, and for continuing contributions to the fields of CP and heavy flavor physics."
2005	–	Susumu Okubo	"For groundbreaking investigations into the pattern of hadronic masses and decay rates, which provided essential clues into the development of the quark model, and for demonstrating that CP violation permits partial decay rate asymmetries."
2006	–	Savas Dimopoulos	"For his creative ideas on dynamical symmetry breaking, supersymmetry, and extra spatial dimensions, which have shaped theoretical research on TeV-scale physics, thereby inspiring a wide range of experiments."
2007	–	Stanley Brodsky	"For applications of perturbative quantum field theory to critical questions of elementary particle physics, in particular, to the analysis of hard exclusive strong interaction processes."
2008	–	Alexei Smirnov	"For pioneering and influential work on the enhancement of neutrino oscillations in matter, which is essential to a quantitative understanding of the solar neutrino flux."
2008	–	Stanislav Mikheyev	"For pioneering and influential work on the enhancement of neutrino oscillations in matter, which is essential to a quantitative understanding of the solar neutrino flux."
2009	–	Davison E. Soper	"For work in perturbative quantum chromodynamics, including applications to problems pivotal to the interpretation of high energy particle collisions."
2009	–	John C. Collins	"For work in perturbative quantum chromodynamics, including applications to problems pivotal to the interpretation of high energy particle collisions."
2009	Richard Keith Ellis in 2019	R. Keith Ellis	"For work in perturbative quantum chromodynamics, including applications to problems pivotal to the interpretation of high energy particle collisions."
2010	Gerald Stanford Guralnik	Gerald S. Guralnik	"For elucidation of the properties of spontaneous symmetry breaking in four-dimensional relativistic gauge theory and of the mechanism for the consistent generation of vector boson masses."
2010	Carl Richard Hagen in 2010	Carl R. Hagen	"For elucidation of the properties of spontaneous symmetry breaking in four-dimensional relativistic gauge theory and of the mechanism for the consistent generation of vector boson masses."
2010	–	T. W. B. Kibble	"For elucidation of the properties of spontaneous symmetry breaking in four-dimensional relativistic gauge theory and of the mechanism for the consistent generation of vector boson masses."
2010	Robert Brout	Robert Brout	"For elucidation of the properties of spontaneous symmetry breaking in four-dimensional relativistic gauge theory and of the mechanism for the consistent generation of vector boson masses."
2010	Francois Englert in 2013	François Englert	"For elucidation of the properties of spontaneous symmetry breaking in four-dimensional relativistic gauge theory and of the mechanism for the consistent generation of vector boson masses."
2010	Peter Higgs in 2013	Peter Higgs	"For elucidation of the properties of spontaneous symmetry breaking in four-dimensional relativistic gauge theory and of the mechanism for the consistent generation of vector boson masses."
2011	Chris Quigg in 2013	Chris Quigg	"For their work, separately and collectively, to chart a course of the exploration of TeV scale physics using multi-TeV hadron colliders."
2011	–	Estia Eichten	"For their work, separately and collectively, to chart a course of the exploration of TeV scale physics using multi-TeV hadron colliders."
2011	–	Ian Hinchliffe	"For their work, separately and collectively, to chart a course of the exploration of TeV scale physics using multi-TeV hadron colliders."
2011	Kenneth Lane in 2005	Kenneth Lane	"For their work, separately and collectively, to chart a course of the exploration of TeV scale physics using multi-TeV hadron colliders."
2012	Guido Altarelli in 2000	Guido Altarelli	"For key ideas leading to the detailed confirmation of the Standard Model of particle physics, enabling high energy experiments to extract precise information about Quantum Chromodynamics, electroweak interactions and possible new physics."
2012	–	Torbjörn Sjöstrand	"For key ideas leading to the detailed confirmation of the Standard Model of particle physics, enabling high energy experiments to extract precise information about Quantum Chromodynamics, electroweak interactions and possible new physics."
2012	–	Bryan Webber	"For key ideas leading to the detailed confirmation of the Standard Model of particle physics, enabling high energy experiments to extract precise information about Quantum Chromodynamics, electroweak interactions and possible new physics."
2013	Helen Quinn in 2000	Helen Quinn	"For their proposal of the elegant mechanism to resolve the famous problem of strong-CP violation which, in turn, led to the invention of axions, a subject of intense experimental and theoretical investigation for more than three decades."
2013	–	Roberto Peccei	"For their proposal of the elegant mechanism to resolve the famous problem of strong-CP violation which, in turn, led to the invention of axions, a subject of intense experimental and theoretical investigation for more than three decades."
2014	Zvi Bern in 2023	Zvi Bern	"For pathbreaking contributions to the calculation of perturbative scattering amplitudes, which led to a deeper understanding of quantum field theory and to powerful new tools for computing QCD processes."
2014	–	Lance J. Dixon	"For pathbreaking contributions to the calculation of perturbative scattering amplitudes, which led to a deeper understanding of quantum field theory and to powerful new tools for computing QCD processes."
2014	–	David A. Kosower	"For pathbreaking contributions to the calculation of perturbative scattering amplitudes, which led to a deeper understanding of quantum field theory and to powerful new tools for computing QCD processes."
2015	George Zweig in 2015	George Zweig	"For his independent proposal that hadrons are composed of fractionally charged fundamental constituents, called quarks or aces, and for developing its revolutionary implications for hadron masses and properties."
2016	–	G. Peter Lepage	"For inventive applications of quantum field theory to particle physics, particularly in establishing the theory of hadronic exclusive processes, developing nonrelativistic effective field theories, and determining standard-model parameters with lattice gauge theory."
2017	Gordon Kane in 2007	Gordon L. Kane	"For instrumental contributions to the theory of the properties, reactions, and signatures of the Higgs boson."
2017	–	Howard E. Haber	"For instrumental contributions to the theory of the properties, reactions, and signatures of the Higgs boson."
2017	–	Jack F. Gunion	"For instrumental contributions to the theory of the properties, reactions, and signatures of the Higgs boson."
2017	Sally Dawson in 2022	Sally Dawson	"For instrumental contributions to the theory of the properties, reactions, and signatures of the Higgs boson."
2018	–	Ann Nelson	"For groundbreaking explorations of physics beyond the Standard Model of particle physics, including their seminal joint work on dynamical super-symmetry breaking, and for their innovative contributions to a broad range of topics, including new models of electroweak symmetry breaking, baryogenesis, and solutions to the strong charge parity problem."
2018	–	Michael Dine	"For groundbreaking explorations of physics beyond the Standard Model of particle physics, including their seminal joint work on dynamical super-symmetry breaking, and for their innovative contributions to a broad range of topics, including new models of electroweak symmetry breaking, baryogenesis, and solutions to the strong charge parity problem."
2019	Lisa Randall in 2015	Lisa Randall	"For creative contributions to physics beyond the Standard Model, in particular the discovery that warped extra dimensions of space can solve the hierarchy puzzle, which has had a tremendous impact on searches at the Large Hadron Collider."
2019	Raman Sundrum in 2003	Raman Sundrum	"For creative contributions to physics beyond the Standard Model, in particular the discovery that warped extra dimensions of space can solve the hierarchy puzzle, which has had a tremendous impact on searches at the Large Hadron Collider."
2020	Pierre Sikivie in 2019	Pierre Sikivie	"For seminal work recognizing the potential visibility of the invisible axion, devising novel methods to detect it, and for theoretical investigations of its cosmological implications."
2021	–	Vernon Barger	"For pioneering work in collider physics contributing to the discovery and characterization of the W boson, top quark, and Higgs boson, and for the development of incisive strategies to test theoretical ideas with experiments."
2022	Nima Arkani-Hamed	Nima Arkani-Hamed	"For the development of transformative new frameworks for physics beyond the standard model with novel experimental signatures, including work on large extra dimensions, the little Higgs, and more generally for new ideas connected to the origin of the electroweak scale."
2023	–	Heinrich Leutwyler	"For fundamental contributions to the effective field theory of pions at low energies, and for proposing that the gluon is a color octet."
2024	Andrzej Buras in 2012	Andrzej Buras	"For exceptional contributions to quark-flavor physics, in particular, developing and carrying out calculations of higher-order QCD effects to electroweak transitions, as well as for drawing phenomenological connections between kaons, D mesons, and B mesons."
2025	–	Elizabeth E. Jenkins	"For outstanding contributions to the physics of baryons, including deriving many physical properties of nucleons and hyperons in the large number of colors limit of quantum chromodynamics and deriving the renormalization group evolution of the standard model effective field theory at one loop."
2025	–	Aneesh V. Manohar	"For outstanding contributions to the physics of baryons, including deriving many physical properties of nucleons and hyperons in the large number of colors limit of quantum chromodynamics and deriving the renormalization group evolution of the standard model effective field theory at one loop."
2026	–	John F. Donoghue	"For original and lasting contributions to the development of effective field theories, including work on gravity as an effective quantum field theory, and important contributions to chiral perturbation theory."
2027	Thomas Gehrmann in 2026	Thomas Gehrmann	"For transformative contributions to computational methods in quantum field theory and precision tests of the Standard Model, including key results on lepton g-2, jet physics, and modern Feynman diagram methods."
2027	–	Stefano Laporta	"For transformative contributions to computational methods in quantum field theory and precision tests of the Standard Model, including key results on lepton g-2, jet physics, and modern Feynman diagram methods."
2027	-	Ettore Remiddi	"For transformative contributions to computational methods in quantum field theory and precision tests of the Standard Model, including key results on lepton g-2, jet physics, and modern Feynman diagram methods."

== See also ==
- List of American Physical Society prizes and awards
- List of physics awards
- List of awards named after people
