= William Marciano =

American physicist

William Joseph Marciano (born October 11, 1947) is an American theoretical physicist, specializing in elementary particle physics.

== Education and career ==
Marciano graduated with a B.S. and an M.S. in physics at New York University. There he received in 1974 his doctorate with Alberto Sirlin as doctoral advisor. Marciano worked from 1974 to 1980 at Rockefeller University, where he started as a research associate and was then promoted to assistant professor. From 1980 to 1981 he was an associate professor at Northwestern University. At Brookhaven National Laboratory (BNL) he was in 1978 a research collaborator in 1978 and in 1981 joined the physics department and was granted tenure. At BNL he was promoted on 1986 to senior physicist and from 1987 to 1998 was the leader of the physics department's High-Energy Theory Group. He is currently at BNL a senior physicist and since 1990 has also been an adjunct professor at Yale University. He has served as an associate editor for Physical Review Letters, Physical Review D, Reviews of Modern Physics, and the Journal of High Energy Physics.

His research interests span many aspects of elementary particle physics including: Precision Electroweak Calculations, Grand Unified Theories, Neutrino Physics, Rare Decays and CP Violation.

With Heinz Pagels he wrote a highly-cited review article on quantum chromodynamics, published in Physics Reports in 1978.

The research of Marciano and Sirlin was important for experiments at BNL for the precise determination of the anomalous magnetic moment of the muon and the precise calculation of the masses of the W and Z bosons involved in electroweak interactions; such calculations are important for estimating the mass of the Higgs boson. In neutrino physics, Marciano and his collaborators proposed novel neutrino experiments with very long transmission distances around 2500 km from the neutrino generation in accelerators to neutrino detectors in mines.

Marciano became in 1986 a fellow of the American Physical Society and received in 2001 an Alexander von Humboldt Award. In 2002 he received, jointly with Alberto Sirlin, the Sakurai Prize for "their pioneering work on radiative corrections, which made precision electroweak studies a powerful method of probing the Standard Model and searching for new physics."

== Selected publications ==
- Marciano, W. J.; Sirlin, A. (1980). "Radiative corrections to neutrino-induced neutral-current phenomena in the SU(2)_{L}×U(1) theory". Physical Review D. 22 (11): 2695–2717. Bibcode:1980PhRvD..22.2695M. doi:10.1103/PhysRevD.22.2695. (over 1050 citations)
- Czarnecki, Andrzej; Marciano, William J.; Vainshtein, Arkady (2003). "Refinements in electroweak contributions to the muon anomalous magnetic moment". Physical Review D. 67 (7) 073006. arXiv:hep-ph/0212229. Bibcode:2003PhRvD..67g3006C. doi:10.1103/PhysRevD.67.073006.
- Marciano, William J.; Mori, Toshinori; Roney, J. Michael (2008). "Charged Lepton Flavor Violation Experiments". Annual Review of Nuclear and Particle Science. 58 (1): 315–341. Bibcode:2008ARNPS..58..315M. doi:10.1146/annurev.nucl.58.110707.171126.
- Davoudiasl, Hooman; Lee, Hye-Sung; Marciano, William J. (2014). "Muon g−2, rare kaon decays, and parity violation from dark bosons". Physical Review D. 89 (9) 095006. arXiv:1402.3620. Bibcode:2014PhRvD..89i5006D. doi:10.1103/PhysRevD.89.095006. S2CID 118567855.
- Chen, Chien-Yi; Davoudiasl, Hooman; Marciano, William J.; Zhang, Cen (2016). "Implications of a light "dark Higgs" solution to the g_{μ}−2 discrepancy". Physical Review D. 93 (3) 035006. arXiv:1511.04715. Bibcode:2016PhRvD..93c5006C. doi:10.1103/PhysRevD.93.035006. S2CID 119215582.
- Aoyama, T.; et al. (2020). "The anomalous magnetic moment of the muon in the Standard Model". Physics Reports. 887: 1–166. arXiv:2006.04822. Bibcode:2020PhR...887....1A. doi:10.1016/j.physrep.2020.07.006. S2CID 219559166.
