= Ian Hinchliffe =

British physicist (born 1952)

Ian Hinchliffe (born 1952) is a British physicist at Lawrence Berkeley National Laboratory.

Hinchliffe studied physics at Oxford University, where he obtained his BA and in 1977 under the supervision of Christopher Llewellyn Smith a D. Phil in theoretical particle physics.

In 1983 he became a Staff Senior Scientist at Lawrence Berkeley National Laboratory, where he served as head of the theoretical physics group from 1992 to 1999. He is now member emeritus of LBL.

Trained in theoretical physics, his primary activity is with the ATLAS experiment at CERN's Large Hadron Collider, which he joined in 1996; he served as ATLAS physics coordinator in 2006–2007 and currently heads Berkeley Lab's ATLAS group. His research emphasizes the importance of experiment in testing theoretical ideas, and in driving theoretical developments aimed at understanding interactions among fundamental particles. Much of his research looks to show how the Standard Model can be tested at hadron colliders.

In 2011, Ian Hinchliffe, Chris Quigg, Estia Eichten, and Kenneth Lane won the J. J. Sakurai Prize for Theoretical Particle Physics "for their work, separately and collectively, to chart a course of the exploration of TeV scale physics using multi-TeV hadron colliders".

== See also ==
- Betteridge's law of headlines § Hinchliffe's rule
