= John C. Collins =

American theoretical physicist

- Education: University of Cambridge
- Known for: quantum chromodynamics (QCD) perturbative QCD; QCD factorization theorems
- Awards: J.J. Sakurai Prize for Theoretical Particle Physics (2009)
- Scientific career
- Fields: Physics
- Workplaces: Pennsylvania State University

John Clements Collins (born 1949) is a British-born American theoretical physicist and professor of physics at Pennsylvania State University. He attended the University of Cambridge where he obtained a B.A. in mathematics 1971 and a Ph.D. in theoretical physics in 1975. He worked as a postdoc and assistant professor from 1975 to 1980 at Princeton University. Collins was part of the faculty of the Illinois Institute of Technology from 1980 to 1990. From 1990 to the present, he has been a faculty member in the department of physics at Pennsylvania State University where he currently holds the position of distinguished professor. He is a Fellow of the American Physical Society and received the Guggenheim Fellowship in 1986. In 2009, he was awarded the Sakurai Prize along with R. Keith Ellis and Davison E. Soper.

== Research ==
John Collins is known primarily for his foundational contributions to the development of perturbative quantum chromodynamics (QCD), especially the formulation and subsequent development of the QCD factorization theorems. Much of this work was done in collaboration with Davison E. Soper and George Sterman. Collins also contributed to the formulation of factorization proofs for exclusive processes and he provided a proof of factorization for hard high-energy diffraction.

The Collins mechanism was proposed to explain the existence of transverse spin dependence in hadron collisions.

Collins is the author of two books, both published by the Cambridge University Press: Renormalization: An Introduction to Renormalization, the Renormalization Group and the Operator-Product Expansion was published in 1986 and Foundations of Perturbative QCD was published in 2011.
