= John F. Gunion =

American theoretical physicist

John "Jack" Francis Gunion
- Born: July 21, 1943 (age 83); Washington, DC
- Education: University of California, San Diego (Ph.D.); Cornell University (B.A.)
- Known for: Supersymmetry; Higgs Physics
- Awards: Fulbright Fellowship (1965-66); Sakurai Prize (2017)
- Scientific career
- Fields: Physics
- Workplaces: University of California, Davis
- Thesis: Redemption of the dual description of production processes by unitarity. The relevance of the eikonal model (1970)
- Doctoral advisor: William R. Frazer
- Doctoral students: Leszek Roszkowski, Yun Jiang

John "Jack" Francis Gunion (born 21 July 1943 in Washington, DC) is an American physicist, specializing in theoretical high energy physics.

Gunion received in 1965 his bachelor's degree from Cornell University and in 1970 his Ph.D. from the University of California, San Diego. As a postdoc he was from 1970 to 1972 at SLAC and from 1972 to 1973 at the Massachusetts Institute of Technology. From 1973 to 1975 he was an assistant professor at the University of Pittsburgh. In 1978 he moved to the University of California, Davis and remained there, retiring in 2017 as professor emeritus.

He led the High Energy Physics Theory Group of the United States Department of Energy and was one of the initiators of the High Energy Frontier Theory Initiative (HEFTI).

As a result of his early work establishing the importance of the two-photon and four-lepton search modes for detecting a Standard Model Higgs boson and the detector properties needed to exploit them, Dr. Gunion was made a member of the Large Hadron Collider Compact Muon Solenoid (CMS) collaboration and was coauthor on the CMS Higgs discovery paper in which these modes played key roles.

He coauthored, with three collaborators, an important monograph on the physics of the Higgs boson. He is the author or coauthor of hundreds of scientific articles and has an h-index of 100. He is currently working on Higgs physics beyond the Standard Model and supersymmetry with a focus on future collider detections of such physics.

From 1974 to 1978 he was a Sloan Fellow and in 1989 he was elected a Fellow of the American Physical Society. In 2000 he was Schrödinger Professor at the Schrödinger Institute of the University of Vienna. He is a member of the American Association for the Advancement of Science. In 2017 he, together with three collaborators, received the Sakurai Prize for "instrumental contributions to the theory of the properties, reactions, and signatures of the Higgs boson".

== Selected publications ==
- with Howard Haber, Gordon L. Kane, and Sally Dawson: The Higgs Hunter's Guide, Addison Wesley 1990, Westview Press 2000, CRC Press 2018
