= Davison Soper =

American physicist

Davison "Dave" Eugene Soper (21 March 1943, Milwaukee, Wisconsin) is an American theoretical physicist specializing in high energy physics.

== Education and career ==
Soper received his bachelor's degree in 1965 from Amherst College, and his PhD in 1971 under James Bjorken at Stanford University, where he worked with John Kogut. From 1971 to 1973 Soper was an instructor, and from 1973 to 1977 an assistant professor at Princeton University. He was appointed in 1977–80 an assistant professor, in 1980–83 an associate professor, and from 1983 to the present a professor at the University of Oregon, where from 2004 to 2007 he was chair of the physics department.

His doctoral dissertation on Null Plane Field Theory dealt with the theory of high energy scattering processes in the parton model. With George Sterman and John C. Collins, he proved a factorization theorem in perturbative quantum chromodynamics (QCD).

Soper is a member of the "Coordinated Theoretical-Experimental Project on QCD" (CTEQ), whose co-spokesperson he was from 2001 to 2004. He was on the editorial board of Physical Review Letters and Physical Review D.

== Honors ==
- The Sakurai Prize of the American Physical Society., 2009, with R. Keith Ellis and John C. Collins, For work in perturbative Quantum Chromodynamics, including applications to problems pivotal to the interpretation of high energy particle collisions.
- Fellow, American Physical Society, 2010, cited For seminal work in Perturbative Quantum Chromodynamics, especially proving theorems on factorization which play a crucial role in interpreting high energy particle collisions.

== Selected publications ==
- Classical Field Theory. Dover Publ., Mineola, NY 2008, ISBN 978-0-486-46260-8 (originally published by Wiley, New York 1976).
