= John Chalker =

British physicist

John Chalker is a British physicist. He taught at the University of Oxford and the Imperial College London. He won a Dirac Medal in 2018, a John William Strutt, Lord Rayleigh Medal and Prize in 2022 and a Lars Onsager Prize in 2027.
