= Anne Taormina =

Belgian mathematical physicist

Anne Taormina is a Belgian and British mathematical physicist whose research topics include string theory, conformal field theory, and Mathieu moonshine. Beyond mathematical physics, she has also studied the icosahedral symmetry of virus capsids. She was Professor of Theoretical Particle Physics in the Department of Mathematical Sciences at Durham University and served as Head of Department there from January 2014 til December 2018. On 1st September 2024, she moved to King's College London as Head of Department of Mathematics.

== Early life and education ==
Taormina is originally from Mons in Belgium; her parents were schoolteachers, and she has two sisters, one who became a physician and another who became a translator. She earned a license in mathematical sciences in 1980 from the University of Mons, and completed her doctorate in theoretical particle physics at the same university in 1984 under the supervision of Jean Nuyts.

== Career ==
After short-term research positions with the Belgian National Fund for Scientific Research, the laboratory for theoretical physics at the École normale supérieure (Paris) (supported by the French National Centre for Scientific Research), CERN in Geneva, and the University of Chicago, she came to Durham in 1991 as a Science and Engineering Research Council Advanced Fellow. She remained at Durham as a temporary lecturer for 1996–1997, and as a Leverhulme Postdoc from 1997 to 2000, until becoming a lecturer in 2000. She was promoted to reader in 2004 and professor in 2006.

Taormina headed the Durham Department of Mathematical Sciences for five years, from 2014 to 2018, and is a member of the council of the London Mathematical Society.

== Personal life ==
Taormina is married to British physicist Nigel Glover, also a professor at Durham.
