= John David Jackson (physicist) =

Canadian-American theoretical physicist (1925–2016)

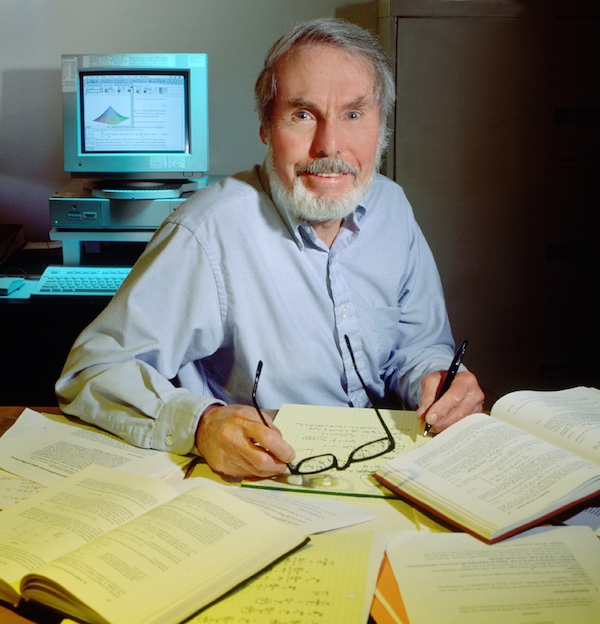
- Jackson in 1991
- Born: January 19, 1925; London, Ontario, Canada
- Died: May 20, 2016 (aged 91); Lansing, Michigan, U.S.
- Education: University of Western Ontario (B.Sc. 1946); MIT (Ph.D. 1949)
- Known for: Classical Electrodynamics
- Awards: Hon. D.Sc., University of Western Ontario, 1989
- Scientific career
- Fields: Nuclear physics Particle physics Electrodynamics
- Workplaces: MIT; McGill University; University of Illinois; University of California, Berkeley; Lawrence Berkeley National Laboratory
- Thesis: Theoretical interpretation of proton-proton scattering (1946)
- Doctoral advisor: Victor Frederick Weisskopf
- Doctoral students: Gordon L. Kane; Chris Quigg; Richard D. Field

John David Jackson (January 19, 1925 – May 20, 2016) was a Canadian–American theoretical physicist. He was a professor at the University of California, Berkeley and a faculty senior scientist emeritus at Lawrence Berkeley National Laboratory.

Jackson was a member of the National Academy of Sciences and was well known for his work in nuclear and particle physics, as well as his widely used graduate text on classical electrodynamics.

== Early life and education ==
Born in London, Ontario, Canada, Jackson attended the University of Western Ontario, receiving a B.Sc. in honors physics and mathematics in 1946. He went on to graduate study at MIT, where he worked under Victor Weisskopf, completing his Ph.D. thesis in 1949.

== Academic career ==
Jackson held academic appointments successively at McGill University, thanks to Philip Russell Wallace, a prominent Canadian theoretical physicist, (January 1950 – 1957); then the University of Illinois at Urbana–Champaign (1957–1967); and finally the University of California, Berkeley (1967–1995). At McGill, he was Assistant and Associate Professor of Mathematics; at Illinois and Berkeley, he was in the Physics Departments. At the latter, he held appointments on campus and at the Lawrence Berkeley National Laboratory. After retiring from teaching in 1993, he continued to be active at LBNL.

=== McGill and Princeton ===
At McGill in the 1950s, in addition to appreciable teaching, Jackson found time for research on atomic processes and nuclear reactions at intermediate energies and the beginnings of his book on classical electricity and magnetism.

While on leave at Princeton University, he found a fruitful collaboration with Sam Treiman and H. W. Wyld on weak interactions, particularly the various observable decay correlations in allowed nuclear beta decay involving the electron's momentum, its spin, the neutrino's momentum, and the nuclear spin that provide information about parity conservation or non-conservation and time reversal conservation or not. He also published an early paper on the theoretical foundation for the then recently discovered muon-catalyzed fusion of hydrogen isotopes.

=== Illinois (1957–1967) and CERN (1963–64) ===
While at the University of Illinois (1957–1967) Jackson initially continued work on weak interactions as well as strange particle interactions at low energy with Wyld and others. On sabbatical leave at CERN in 1963–64, he collaborated with Kurt Gottfried on production and decay of unstable resonances in high-energy hadronic collisions. They introduced the use of the density matrix to connect production mechanisms to the decay patterns and described the influence of competing processes ("absorption") on the reactions.

During this period Jackson lectured at three summer schools—on dispersion relations at the first Scottish Universities Summer School in Physics, 1960; on weak interactions at the Brandeis Summer Institute, 1962; and on particle and polarization decay distributions at the Summer School of Theoretical Physics, Les Houches, 1965. He also published three books, one on particle physics, based on lectures at the Canadian Summer School in Edmonton and Jasper, 1957; the second, a small book on mathematics for quantum mechanics (1962) and the third, also in 1962, the first edition of his text on classical electrodynamics. The book is notorious for the difficulty of its problems, and its tendency to treat non-obvious conclusions as self-evident. Jackson's high standards and admonitory vocabulary are the subject of an amusing memorial volume by his son Ian Jackson.

=== Berkeley ===
Moving to Berkeley in 1967, Jackson taught on campus, both introductory courses for physicists and engineers and graduate courses in particle physics and quantum mechanics. His lecture notes from the latter have been made into book. He did his research at LBNL and served in administrative positions at both the campus (Chair, University of California, Berkeley (UCB) Physics Department, 1978–1981) and the lab (Head, LBNL Physics Division, January 1982 – June 1984). In the formative years of the ill-fated Superconducting Super Collider (SSC) project, he served as deputy director of operations of the SSC Central Design Group.

In the 1960s and 1970s his research alone and with students focused in journal publications and conference papers on models of high energy processes, radiative and resolution corrections for resonances in electron–positron annihilation, spin-flip synchrotron radiation and the polarization of electrons in a storage ring, and, after November 1974, the spectroscopy of the charm–anticharm particles. In 1973, he lectured again at the Scottish Universities Summer School in Physics (SUSSP), on hadronic interactions at high energies, and in 1976 at the Stanford Linear Accelerator Center (SLAC) National Accelerator Laboratory's, SLAC Summer Institute (SSI), on charmonium spectroscopy. In 1973–74 he ran the nascent theory group at Fermilab and co-edited the proceedings of the 1973 "Rochester" Conference.

In January 1977 Jackson began a 17-year stint as Editor of Annual Review of Nuclear and Particle Science. In much of the 1980s he was involved with many others in the high-energy physics community in activities aimed at the next step up in accelerators. Then in 1983 he became active in the R&D for the SSC, and on the program advisory committee for the SSC Laboratory when it began in Texas in 1988.

== Retirement years ==
Jackson retired from teaching in May 1995, but retained his connection with LBNL. In the 1990s and beyond his time was increasingly devoted to semi-historical talks and publications on a variety of topics, with a foray into refuting suggestions that cancer may be caused by environmental radiation stemming from ubiquitous electronics use. This includes a continuing series of papers in the American Journal of Physics on diverse topics in electromagnetism, including rebuttals of mistaken ideas. History of physics publications include the historical roots of gauge invariance, examples of the misattribution of discoveries in physics, and the editing of a sequel to R. T. Birge's history of the Berkeley Physics Department.

== Students ==
His students include Hubert Reeves Gordon L. Kane, Robert N. Cahn (LBNL), Richard D. Field and Chris Quigg.

== Memberships and honors ==
Jackson was a Fellow of the American Physical Society (elected in 1961), a Member of the American Academy of Arts and Sciences, and a Member of the National Academy of Sciences (elected in 1990). In 1956, he was awarded a Guggenheim Fellowship. In 1989, he received an Honorary D. Sc. from his alma mater, the University of Western Ontario. In 2009, in recognition of his own contributions to classroom teaching and his textbook, the American Association of Physics Teachers created the "J. D. Jackson Award for Excellence in Graduate Education", with the first award in February 2010 to Eugene D. Commins.

== Books ==
- Jackson JD, Classical Electrodynamics, 3rd ed, Wiley, 1999.
- Jackson JD, Mathematics for Quantum Mechanics: An Introductory Survey of Operators, Eigenvalues, and Linear Vector Spaces, Dover, 2006. (Note: Reissue of the 1962 textbook published by WA Benjamin.)
- Jackson JD, The Physics of Elementary Particles, Princeton University, 1958.
- Jackson JD, Cahn RN, A Course in Quantum Mechanics, Wiley, 2024. (Note: Published posthumously.)

== See also ==
- List of textbooks in electromagnetism
