= Chien-Peng Yuan =

Taiwanese physicist

Chien-Peng Yuan is a Taiwanese physicist.

Yuan graduated from National Taiwan University and pursued doctoral study at the University of Michigan. He began teaching at Michigan State University in 1992, was appointed to a full professorship in 2004, and subsequently assumed the Wu-Ki Tung Endowed Professorship in Particle Physics in October 2017. In 2013, the American Physical Society elevated Yuan to fellow status, acknowledging him "[f]or original contributions to the theory of single top-quark production, the development of QCD resummation techniques, the global analysis of parton distribution functions, and their application to hadron collider physics."
