= Estia J. Eichten =

American theoretical physicist

- Born: October 12, 1946 (age 79); Stillwater, Minnesota
- Education: Massachusetts Institute of Technology (B.S., Ph.D.)
- Known for: Charmonium; Technicolor; Cornell potential
- Awards: Sakurai Prize (2011)
- Scientific career
- Fields: Particle physics Phenomenology
- Workplaces: Fermilab
- Doctoral advisor: Roman Jackiw, MIT

Estia Joseph Eichten (born 1946), is an American theoretical physicist, of the Fermi National Accelerator Laboratory (Fermilab). He received his Ph.D. in 1972 from the MIT Center for Theoretical Physics, where he was a student of Roman Jackiw's, and was associate professor of physics at Harvard before joining the Fermilab Theoretical Physics Department in 1982.

In 1984 Eichten coauthored "Supercollider Physics" (with Kenneth Lane, Ian Hinchliffe and Chris Quigg), which has strongly influenced the quest for future discoveries at hadron colliders, such as the Fermilab Tevatron, the SSC, and the LHC at CERN. He has made many other significant contributions, including the study of the spectroscopy of heavy-light mesons (for which he was an originator of the idea of heavy quark symmetry), quarkonium, and "technicolor" theories of dynamical electroweak symmetry breaking.

In 2011 Eichten with Chris Quigg, Ian Hinchliffe, and Kenneth Lane won the J. J. Sakurai Prize for Theoretical Particle Physics "For their work, separately and collectively, to chart a course of the exploration of TeV scale physics using multi-TeV hadron colliders"
