= Theoretical Advanced Study Institute =

The Theoretical Advanced Study Institute or TASI is a four-week summer school in high-energy physics or astrophysics held yearly at the University of Colorado Boulder. The school is meant primarily for advanced graduate students and consists of a series of pedagogical lectures on selected topics given by active researchers in the field. TASI is the most common summer school attended by high-energy physics graduate students in the United States.

Writeups of the TASI lectures are traditionally collected into a published volume each year, creating a valuable resource for students hoping to learn about current research topics in an accessible way. The writeups are typically also posted by the lecturers on arXiv.org, providing freely-accessible web-based sources on various physics topics. Since 2007, TASI has also posted video recordings of the lectures online.

== Recent TASI schools ==
Year	Date	Theme	Notable speakers	Lectures	
2024	June 3 - 28	The Frontiers of Particle Theory			
2023	June 5 - 30	Aspects of Symmetry	Juan Maldacena Nathan Seiberg		
2022	June 6 - July 1	Ten Years After the Higgs Discovery: Particle Physics Now and Future	Sally Dawson Philip Schuster Raman Sundrum		
2021	June 7 - July 2	Black Holes, Quantum Information, and Dualities	Henriette Elvang Netta Engelhardt Patrick Hayden Monika Schleier-Smith Ashoke Sen Douglas Stanford		
2020	June 1 - 26	The Obscure Universe: Neutrinos and Other Dark Matters	Kate Scholberg	videos	
2019	June 3 - 28	The Many Dimensions of Quantum Field Theory	Nima Arkani-Hamed Juan Maldacena Nathan Seiberg Pedro Vieira Slava Rychkov	videos	
2018	June 4 - 28	Theory in an Era of Data	Dan Hooper	videos	book
2017	June 5 - 30	Physics at the Fundamental Frontier	Juan Maldacena; Cumrun Vafa; Igor Klebanov	videos	
2016	June 6 - July 1	Anticipating the Next Discoveries in Particle Physics	Nima Arkani-Hamed; Matias Zaldarriaga	videos	
2015	June 1 - 26	New Frontiers in Fields and Strings	Joe Polchinski; Juan Maldacena; Pedro Vieira	videos	book
2014	June 2 - 27	Journeys through the Precision Frontier: Amplitudes for Colliders	Chris Quigg	videos	book
2013	June 3 - 28	Particle Physics: The Higgs Boson and Beyond	Max Tegmark	videos	
2012	June 4 - 29	Searching for New Physics at Small and Large Scales	Michael Peskin	videos	book
2011	June 6 - July 1	The Dark Secrets of the Terascale	Pierre Ramond	videos	book
2010	June 1 - 25	String theory and its Applications: From meV to the Planck Scale	Tom Banks; Joe Polchinski; Subir Sachdev	videos	book
2009	June 1 - 26	Physics of the Large and the Small	Michael Turner	videos	book
2008	June 2 - 27	The Dawn of the LHC Era	David E. Kaplan; Bogdan Dobrescu	videos	book
2007	May 28 - June 22	String Universe	Nima Arkani-Hamed; Lisa Randall; David Tong; Barton Zwiebach; Eva Silverstein; Mina Aganagic	videos	
2006	June 4 - 30	Exploring New Frontiers Using Colliders and Neutrinos	Keith Ellis; Alexei Smirnov; Michael Peskin		book
2005	June 5 - July 1	The Many Dimensions of String Theory	David Tong; Joe Polchinski; Eva Silverstein		
2004	June 6 – July 2	Physics in D greater than or equal to 4	George Sterman; Raman Sundrum		book
2003	June 2 – 27	Progress in String Theory	Juan Maldacena; Eva Silverstein		book

== History ==
The first TASI was held in 1984 at the University of Michigan. Subsequent TASIs were held at Yale (1985), Santa Cruz (1986), Santa Fe (1987), and Brown (1988). Since 1989 TASI has been located in Boulder.
