= SLAC Theory Group =

Theoretical physics institute

- Field of research: Theoretical physics
- Location: Menlo Park, California, United States
- Affiliations: Stanford University
- Operating agency: SLAC National Accelerator Laboratory

The SLAC Theory Group is the hub of theoretical particle physics research at the SLAC National Accelerator Laboratory at Stanford University. It is a subdivision of the Elementary Particle Physics (EPP) Division at SLAC.

== Research ==
The group has a diverse research program, specializing in areas of quantum field theory, beyond the standard model physics, dark matter, neutrinos, and collider phenomenology.

== Members ==
The group is currently led by 9 faculty members, and has a dozen postdoctoral researchers and students at any given time.

Notable physicists who were students or postdoctoral researchers in the SLAC Theory Group include Nima Arkani-Hamed, Thomas Appelquist, Mirjam Cvetic, Michael Dine, John Ellis, Rouven Essig, Edward Farhi, Steven Frautschi, Joshua Frieman, Roscoe Giles, Yuval Grossman, Jack F. Gunion, Alan Guth, Howard Haber, Claude Itzykson, Robert Jaffe, David E. Kaplan, Igor Klebanov, Peter Lepage, Christopher Llewellyn Smith, Kirill Melnikov, Stephen Parke, Maxim Perelstein, Joel Primack, Joseph Polchinski, Davison Soper, Henry Tye, Mark Wise, and Tung-Mow Yan.

Past and present members of the SLAC Theory Group have received a total of at least 3 Breakthrough in Fundamental Physics Prizes (US$3 million prize), 10 Sakurai Prizes (US$10,000), 5 Dirac Medals (US$5,000), 4 New Horizons in Physics Prizes (US$100,000), and 2 Gribov Medals (US$5,000).

== Faculty ==
Current and former faculty members in the SLAC Theory Group include:

- James Bjorken, discoverer of Bjorken Scaling (light-cone scaling) and Bjorken Sum Rule, 2004 Dirac Medal recipient and 2015 Wolf Prize recipient
- Richard Blankenbecler, professor emeritus
- Stanley Brodsky, 2007 Sakurai Prize recipient for applications of perturbative quantum field theory to the analysis of hard exclusive strong interaction processes
- Lance Dixon, pioneer of new methods to calculate Feynman diagrams in quantum chromodynamics and other Yang–Mills theories; 2014 recipient of the Sakurai Prize and 2023 recipient of the Galileo Medal
- Sidney Drell, known for his contributions to quantum electrodynamics, including the Drell-Yan process, 2011 National Medal of Science recipient
- Alexander Friedland, neutrino physicist
- JoAnne Hewett, associate lab director of the Fundamental Physics Directorate and the chief research officer at SLAC
- Stefan Hoeche, known for SHERPA parton shower event-generator framework
- Shamit Kachru, pioneer of string theory
- Rebecca Leane, known for novel search strategies for dark matter
- Bernhard Mistlberger, pioneer of multi-loop Higgs calculations at hadron colliders and 2021 Gribov Medal recipient
- Pierre Noyes, known for theoretical work on the quantum mechanical three-body problem for strongly interacting particles
- Jogesh Pati, known for the Pati-Salam model, 2000 Dirac Medal recipient
- Michael Peskin, known for the Peskin–Takeuchi parameter, and his popular Quantum Field Theory textbook with Daniel Schroeder
- Helen Quinn, known for Peccei–Quinn theory which earned her the 2010 Dirac Medal and the 2014 Sakurai Prize
- Thomas Rizzo, Theory Group leader
- Philip Schuster, 2015 New Horizons in Physics Prize recipient, known for new experimental searches for dark sectors using high-intensity electron beams
- Eva Silverstein, known for work on early universe cosmology and string theory, recipient of 1999 MacArthur "Genius grant" award
- Natalia Toro, 2015 New Horizons in Physics Prize recipient, known for new experimental searches for dark sectors using high-intensity electron beams
- Jay Wacker, particle phenomenologist
