= Simon Caron-Huot =

Canadian physicist (born 1984)

Simon Caron-Huot (born 1984 in Saint-Eustache, Quebec) is a Canadian theoretical physicist.

== Education and career ==
In 2009 Simon Caron-Huot graduated with a Ph.D. in physics from McGill University. His Ph.D. thesis was supervised by Guy David Moore. Caron-Huot was from 2009 to 2014 a postdoctoral member of the Institute for Advanced Study. At the Niels Bohr Institute he held a postdoctoral position from 2012 to 2016. At McGill University, he was from 2016 to 2022 an assistant professor and is since 2022 an associate professor. He has been a Visiting Fellow at the Perimeter Institute.

== Research ==
Caron-Huot does research on scattering amplitudes in quantum chromodynamics and N=4 supersymmetric Yang-Mills theory, as well as the quark-gluon plasma in heavy ion collisions. He, with colleagues such as Nima Arkani-Hamed, Freddy Cachazo, and Johannes Henn, have done research on symmetries that link gravity, the energy levels of the hydrogen atom, and the strong and weak interactions. Such mathematical symmetries open up the possibility that the N=4 supersymmetric Yang-Mills theory is the first nontrivial quantum field theory in four dimensions that can be solved exactly. Caron-Huot and colleagues showed that, in this type of Yang-Mills theory, bound states can be solved exactly due to hidden conformal symmetries, similar to the quantum mechanical Kepler problem (with the Laplace-Runge-Lenz vector as a conserved quantity).

== Awards and honours ==
In 2017 Simon Caron-Huot received the Gribov Medal for "his ground-breaking conttibutions to the understanding of the analytic structure of scattering amplitudes and their relation to Wilson loops." In 2018 the International Colloquium on Group Theoretical Methods in Physics (ICGTMP) awarded the ICGTMP's Hermann Weyl Prize to him and David Simmons-Duffin. In 2020 Simon Caron-Huot was awarded a two-year Sloan Research Fellowship, and he and Pedro Vieira were awarded the New Horizons in Physics Prize for "profound contributions to the understanding of quantum field theory." The Canadian Association of Physicists (CAP) awarded Caron-Huot the 2021 CAP Herzberg Medal for "his creation and development of nonperturbative techniques in conformal field theory, thereby opening the way to broad-ranging applications from particle physics to condensed matter physics." In 2023 he received the Larkin Junior Researcher Award of the William I. Fine Theoretical Physics Institute. In 2024 the Niels Bohr International Academy, which is hosted by the Niels Bohr Institute, awarded him the Lars Kann-Rasmussen Prize.

== Selected publications ==
- Caron-Huot, S. (2011). "Superconformal symmetry and two-loop amplitudes in planar N = 4 super Yang-Mills". Journal of High Energy Physics (12) 66. arXiv:1105.5606. Bibcode:2011JHEP...12..066C. doi:10.1007/JHEP12(2011)066.
- Arkani-Hamed, N.; Bourjaily, J.; Cachazo, F.; Caron-Huot, S.; Trnka, J. (2011). "The all-loop integrand for scattering amplitudes in planar N = 4 SYM". Journal of High Energy Physics (1): 41. arXiv:1008.2958. Bibcode:2011JHEP...01..041A. doi:10.1007/JHEP01(2011)041.
- Caron-Huot, S. (2011). "Notes on the scattering amplitude — Wilson loop duality". Journal of High Energy Physics (7) 58. arXiv:1010.1167. Bibcode:2011JHEP...07..058C. doi:10.1007/JHEP07(2011)058.
- Caron-Huot, S. (2011). "Loops and trees". Journal of High Energy Physics (5) 80. arXiv:1007.3224. Bibcode:2011JHEP...05..080C. doi:10.1007/JHEP05(2011)080.
- Caron-Huot, Simon (2013). "When does the gluon reggeize?". Journal of High Energy Physics. 2015 (5) 93. arXiv:1309.6521. doi:10.1007/JHEP05(2015)093.
- Caron-Huot, Simon; Komargodski, Zohar; Sever, Amit; Zhiboedov, Alexander (2017). "Strings from massive higher spins: The asymptotic uniqueness of the Veneziano amplitude". Journal of High Energy Physics (10) 26. arXiv:1607.04253. Bibcode:2017JHEP...10..026C. doi:10.1007/JHEP10(2017)026.
- Caron-Huot, Simon; Henn, Johannes M. (2014). "Solvable Relativistic Hydrogenlike System in Supersymmetric Yang-Mills Theory". Physical Review Letters. 113 (16) 161601. arXiv:1408.0296. Bibcode:2014PhRvL.113p1601C. doi:10.1103/PhysRevLett.113.161601. PMID 25361249.
- Baadsgaard, Christian; Bjerrum-Bohr, N. E. J.; Bourjaily, Jacob L.; Caron-Huot, Simon; Damgaard, Poul H.; Feng, Bo (2016). "New Representations of the Perturbative S-Matrix". Physical Review Letters. 116 (6) 061601. arXiv:1509.02169. Bibcode:2016PhRvL.116f1601B. doi:10.1103/PhysRevLett.116.061601. PMID 26918978.
- Caron-Huot, Simon (2017). "Analyticity in spin in conformal theories". Journal of High Energy Physics (9) 78. arXiv:1703.00278. Bibcode:2017JHEP...09..078C. doi:10.1007/JHEP09(2017)078.
- Caron-Huot, Simon; Trinh, Anh-Khoi (2019). "All tree-level correlators in AdS_{5}×S_{5} supergravity: Hidden ten-dimensional conformal symmetry". Journal of High Energy Physics (1): 196. arXiv:1809.09173. Bibcode:2019JHEP...01..196C. doi:10.1007/JHEP01(2019)196.
- Gardi, Einan; Caron-Huot, Simon; Reichel, Joscha; Vernazza, Leonardo (2019). "The High-Energy Limit of 2 to 2 Partonic Scattering Amplitudes". The High-Energy Limit of 2-to-2 Partonic Scattering Amplitudes. Vol. 375. SISSA Medialab. p. 050. arXiv:1912.10883. Bibcode:2019isrc.confE..50G. doi:10.22323/1.375.0050.
- Caron-Huot, Simon; Dixon, Lance J.; Drummond, James M.; Dulat, Falko; Foster, Jack; Gürdoğan, Ömer; Matt von Hippel; McLeod, Andrew J.; Papathanasiou, Georgios (2020). "The Steinmann Cluster Bootstrap for N=4 Super Yang-Mills Amplitudes". Proceedings of Corfu Summer Institute 2019 "School and Workshops on Elementary Particle Physics and Gravity" — PoS(CORFU2019). Vol. 376. SISSA Medialab. p. 003. arXiv:2005.06735. doi:10.22323/1.376.0003.
- Bourjaily, Jacob L.; Caron-Huot, Simon (2023). "Loops from Cuts". arXiv:2305.01673 [hep-th].
- Caron-Huot, Simon; Tokuda, Junsei (2024). "String loops and gravitational positivity bounds: Imprint of light particles at high energies". Journal of High Energy Physics (11) 55. arXiv:2406.07606. Bibcode:2024JHEP...11..055C. doi:10.1007/JHEP11(2024)055.
