= Berkeley Center for Theoretical Physics =

Research center at the University of California, Berkeley

- Established: 2000
- Research type: Theoretical physics
- Director: Yasunori Nomura
- Faculty: Mina Aganagic; Raphael Bousso; Mary Gaillard; Ori Ganor; Lawrence John Hall; Petr Horava; Hitoshi Murayama; Geoffrey Penington; Benjamin Safdi
- Staff: Christian Bauer; Simon Knapen; Zoltan Ligeti; Dean Robinson
- Location: Berkeley, California, United States
- Affiliations: University of California, Berkeley; Lawrence Berkeley National Laboratory

The Berkeley Center for Theoretical Physics (BCTP) is a research center for theoretical particle physics, cosmology, string theory and quantum gravity at the University of California at Berkeley.

== About ==
The BCTP houses theoretical physics research at Berkeley and has close links to Lawrence Berkeley National Laboratory (LBNL). It is located in Old LeConte Hall on the Berkeley campus. Though the BCTP itself was founded at the turn of the 21st century, Berkeley has a rich history in the field of theoretical particle physics, with prominent former physicists including Manhattan project director Robert Oppenheimer; Nobel Laureates Steven Weinberg, Sheldon Glashow, and David Gross; Breakthrough Prize winners John Schwarz, Joseph Polchinski, and Nima Arkani-Hamed; Sakurai Prize winners Mary Gaillard, Leonard Susskind, and Lisa Randall; as well as Dirac Medal winners Bruno Zumino and Stanley Mandelstam. The current senior members consist of 10 UC Berkeley faculty and 4 LBNL staff members.

== See also ==
- Institute for Theoretical Physics (disambiguation)
- Center for Theoretical Physics (disambiguation)
