= IOP =

IOP may refer to:

== Organizations ==
- Institute of Optronics, a Pakistani technical organization
- Institute of Physics, London-based professional association for physicists
  - IOP Publishing, its publishing company
- Institute of Physics, Bhubaneswar, an Indian research institute
- Institute of Psychiatry, Psychology and Neuroscience, a school of King's College London, England, previously known as Institute of Psychiatry (IoP)
- Institute of Play, an American educational corporation

== Science and technology ==
- UGV Interoperability Profile
- Cromemco IOP, an input/output processor S-100 card
- Intraocular pressure, the fluid pressure inside the eye
- Intensive outpatient program, a rehabilitation therapy

== Other uses ==
- Independent Olympic Participant: IOC country code
- Isle of Palms, South Carolina, US
- Italian occult psychedelia, a subgenre of Italian psychedelic music
- Industry on Parade, 1950s era sponsored television series of films

== See also ==
- Institute of Physics (disambiguation)
- Institute of Politics (disambiguation)
- IOPS, input/output operations per second
