= Philip Schuster =

Philip Schuster may refer to:

- Philip Schuster (gymnast), American gymnast and track and field athlete
- Philip Schuster (physicist), American theoretical elementary particle physicist
