= Institute of Physics (disambiguation) =

Institute of Physics is a London-based professional association for physicists.

Institute of Physics may also refer to:

- American Institute of Physics
- Australian Institute of Physics
- Institute of Physics, Azerbaijan National Academy of Sciences
- Helsinki Institute of Physics, Finland
- Institute of Physics (FZU), Czech Academy of Sciences
- Institute of Physics, Bhubaneswar, Odisha, India
- Institute of Physics, Chinese Academy of Sciences
- Pakistan Institute of Physics
- National Institute of Physics, Philippines
- The Racah Institute of Physics

== See also ==
- Institute of Nuclear Physics (disambiguation)
- Institute for Theoretical Physics (disambiguation)
