= Mark Levinson (film director) =

American film director

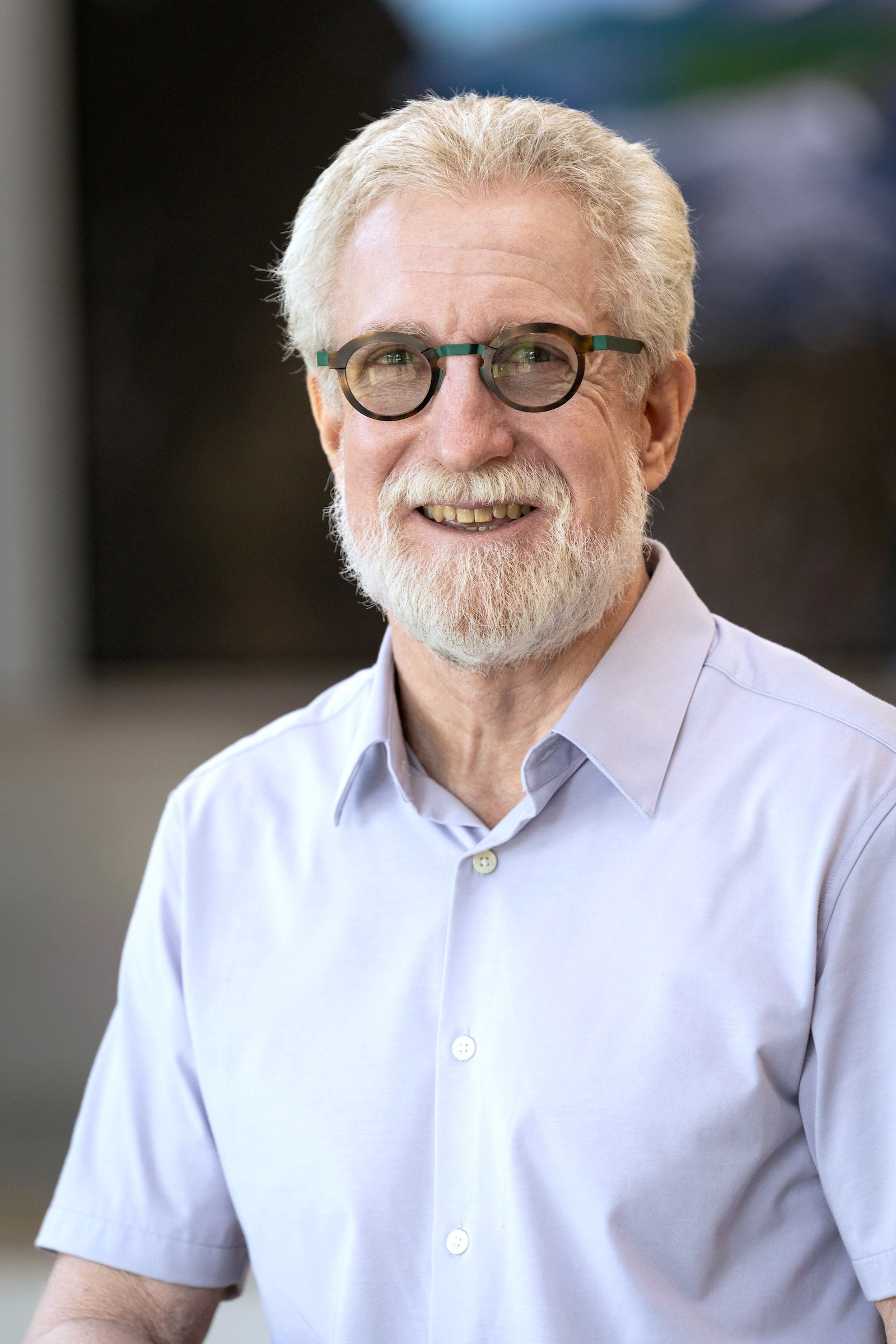
- Levinson in 2024
- Education: Brown University; University of California, Berkeley
- Known for: Particle Fever

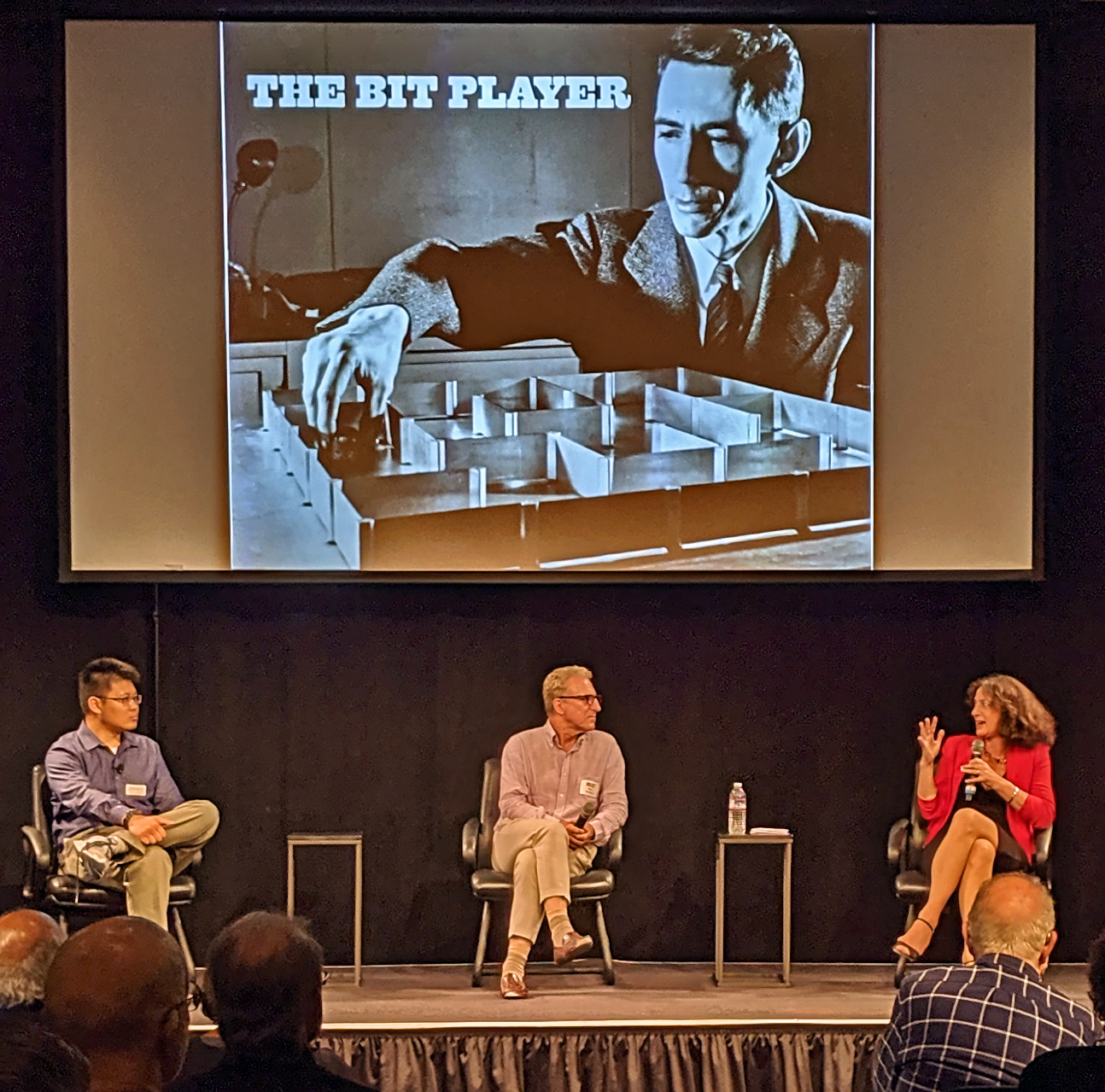
Mark Levinson (center) at the panel discussion after the August 2, 2019, screening of The Bit Player at the Computer History Museum in Mountain View, California

Mark A. Levinson is an American film director. He directed the 2013 documentary Particle Fever and the 2019 documentary The Bit Player.

== Early life ==
Levinson earned a Bachelor of Science degree at Brown University. He received a Ph.D. in physics in 1983 at the University of California, Berkeley. Thereafter, he moved into a career in film and television.

== Career ==
Serving as director of Particle Fever, Levinson told the story of the experimental discovery of the Higgs boson. The film covers the scientific process and the scientists behind the research. He wanted to show science in a realistic and appealing way. In 2007, he met with future co-producer David Kaplan, who had been toying with the idea for a science documentary on the Large Hadron Collider.

He served in various sound production roles, including ADR supervisor in various films and television shows, with 39 credits from 1988 to 2013, including Se7en, The English Patient, The Talented Mr. Ripley, Cold Mountain and House of Cards.

He is the writer/producer/director of the fiction film Prisoner of Time, which examined the lives of former Russian dissident artists after the collapse of the Soviet Union. The film was acclaimed during its premiere at the Moscow International Film Festival.

In 2016, Levinson was working on a film adaptation of Richard Powers' novel The Gold Bug Variations.

In 2016 he was awarded the inaugural Stephen Hawking Medal for Science Communication for Particle Fever.

In 2019, in partnership with the IEEE Information Theory Society, he completed a documentary The Bit Player about Claude Shannon, "The Father of Information Theory."

In 2020 he was awarded the inaugural NEST Robert E. Sievers Leonardo da Vinci Award for work at the intersection of art and science

In 2024 he premiered his film The Universe in a Grain of Sand, a meditation on how both scientists and artists use their understanding of nature to create new tools and representations to make sense of the world.
