= Stanford Institute for Theoretical Physics =

Stanford University research institute

The Stanford Leinweber Institute for Theoretical Physics (LITP) is a research institute within the Physics Department at Stanford University. Led by 16 physics faculty members, the institute conducts research in high energy and condensed matter theoretical physics.

== Research ==
Stanford Leinweber Institute for Theoretical Physics
- Research type: theoretical physics particle physics cosmology condensed matter physics
- Director: Peter Graham
- Location: Palo Alto, California, United States
- Affiliations: Stanford University
- Nobel laureates: Robert Laughlin

Research within LITP includes a strong focus on fundamental questions about the new physics underlying the Standard Models of particle physics and cosmology, and on the nature and applications of our basic frameworks (quantum field theory and string theory) for attacking these questions.

Principal areas of research include:

- Biophysics
- Condensed matter theory
- Cosmology
- Formal theory
- Physics beyond the standard model
- "Precision frontiers"
- Quantum computing
- Quantum gravity

Central questions include:

- What governs particle theory beyond the scale of electroweak symmetry breaking?
- How do string theory and holography resolve the basic puzzles of general relativity, including the deep issues arising in black hole physics and the study of cosmological horizons?
- Which class of models of inflationary cosmology captures the physics of the early universe, and what preceded inflation?
- Can physicists develop new techniques in quantum field theory and string theory to shed light on mysterious phases arising in many contexts in condensed matter physics (notably, in the high temperature superconductors)?

== Faculty ==
Current faculty include:

- Savas Dimopoulos, theorist focusing on physics beyond the standard model; winner of Sakurai Prize
- Sebastian Doniach, condensed matter physicist
- Daniel Fisher, biophysicist
- Surya Ganguli, theoretical neuroscientist
- Peter Graham, winner of 2017 New Horizons Prize
- Patrick Hayden, quantum information theorist
- Shamit Kachru, string theorist
- Renata Kallosh, noted string theorist
- Vedika Khemani, condensed matter theorist
- Steven Kivelson, condensed matter theorist
- Robert Laughlin, Nobel Laureate known for work on fractional quantum Hall effect
- Andrei Linde, cosmologist and winner of Breakthrough Prize in Fundamental Physics
- Xiaoliang Qi, quantum gravity and quantum information
- Srinivas Raghu, condensed matter theorist
- Stephen Shenker, string theorist
- Eva Silverstein, cosmologist, string theorist, and recipient of MacArthur "Genius grant" award
- Douglas Stanford, quantum gravity theorist
- Leonard Susskind, string theorist known for string landscape; popular science book author

== See also ==
- List of computational physics software

== See also ==
- Institute for Theoretical Physics (disambiguation)
- Center for Theoretical Physics (disambiguation)
