= Jesse Thaler =

American particle physicist

- Education: Brown (Sc.B); Harvard (PhD)
- Known for: Jet substructure
- Scientific career
- Fields: Particle physics
- Workplaces: Miller Fellow, UC Berkeley; Massachusetts Institute of Technology
- Academic advisors: Antal Jevicki (Sc.B.); Nima Arkani-Hamed (PhD)
- Doctoral students: Lina Necib

Jesse Thaler is an American particle physicist who is a professor at the MIT Department of Physics. He was named director of the NSF Institute for Artificial Intelligence and Fundamental Interactions (IAIFI) upon its creation in August 2020.

== Education and research ==
Thaler grew up in York, Maine, and attended high school at Phillips Exeter Academy, where he won the Cox Medal, an award for the top five in the graduating class. From 1998 to 2002, he pursued a physics major magna cum laude from Brown University, where he was a member of Phi Beta Kappa and a funk band. In 2006, Thaler earned a Ph.D. in physics from Harvard University under the supervision of Nima Arkani-Hamed. He went to Berkeley as a Miller Fellow before returning to New England to become a faculty member at the MIT Center for Theoretical Physics in 2010. He earned tenure in 2017 and was promoted to full professor in 2021.

Since 2020, Thaler has been the founding director of one of the inaugural NSF Institute for Artificial Intelligence and Fundamental Interactions, along with Deputy Director Mike Williams.

Thaler focuses on fusing "techniques from QFT and machine learning to address outstanding questions in fundamental physics" and has made major contributions towards understanding the substructure of jets of particles. His work uses machine learning to interpret the large quantities of data collected about jets produced at particle accelerators such as the Large Hadron Collider.

Thaler has also helped design a dark matter experiment, ABRACADABRA, which looks for axions and is currently in operation.

== Teaching and Mentoring ==
Thaler has won multiple teaching and mentoring awards from MIT, including the Buechner Faculty Award for Undergraduate Advising (2013), the Buechner Faculty Award for Teaching (2014), and the Perkins Award for Excellence in Graduate Advising (2017), as well as the Certificate of Distinction for Excellence in Teaching from Harvard (2005). His former undergraduate research advisees include three Marshall Scholars. Along with colleague Mike Williams, Thaler also created and co-chairs a new interdisciplinary PhD program in physics, statistics, and data science since 2020.

== Filmography ==
Thaler appeared in the movie Particle Fever.

== Awards ==
- Fellow of the American Physical Society (2022)
- Fermilab Distinguished Scholar (2020)
- Simons Fellow in Theoretical Physics (2018)
- Edgerton Faculty Achievement Award, MIT (2017)
- Sloan Research Fellowship (2013)
- Presidential Early Career Award for Scientists and Engineers (2012)
- DOE Early Career Award (2011)
- Miller Fellowship, Berkeley (2006)
- Goldhaber Prize, Harvard (2005)
- National Science Foundation Graduate Research Fellowship (2002)
- Phi Beta Kappa (2001)
