= ITP =

ITP may refer to:

== Companies and organizations ==
- Independent Theatre Pakistan, a Pakistani theatre company
- Industria de Turbo Propulsores, a Spanish gas turbine manufacturer
- Information Technology & Politics, an organized section of the American Political Science Association with the journal Journal of Information Technology & Politics
- Institute for Theoretical Physics (disambiguation)
- Institute of Telecommunications Professionals, a membership organization for the telecommunications industry in the United Kingdom
- Institutes of Technology and Polytechnics, in New Zealand
- International Therapeutic Proteins, a company that produces biological therapeutics from polyclonal antibodies
- International Third Position, a UK-based political movement
- Intertape Polymer Group, a packaging products manufacturer
- Interurban Transit Partnership, operator of a public transport system in Grand Rapids, Michigan, United States
- Islamabad Traffic Police, a traffic police force in Islamabad, Pakistan

== Computing and technology ==
- In-target probe, a hardware device used in the computer industry to debug processors at the instruction-level
- Interactive Terminal Protocol, an early Packet Assembler/Disassembler protocol for use on X.25 networks
- Isotachophoresis, a separation technique in analytical chemistry
- Intelligent Tracking Prevention, a web tracking blocking technology in the Safari browser

== Education ==
- Institute of Transpersonal Psychology, a graduate school in Palo Alto, California, United States
- Interactive Telecommunications Program, a graduate degree program at the Tisch School of the Arts at New York University
- Interdisciplinary Telecommunications Program, a graduate degree program at the University of Colorado at Boulder

== Other uses ==
- Individual Thought Patterns, the fifth album by death metal band Death
- Immune thrombocytopenic purpura (also idiopathic thrombocytopenia), a bleeding disorder
- Inosine triphosphate
- ITP Publishing Group, a magazine publishing company focusing on the Middle East
- Polikarpov ITP, a Soviet aircraft
