= TriangleBoy =

Proxying tool

TriangleBoy is a proxying tool designed to allow users to get around firewalls and censorship, and anonymously visit web sites. The tool was created by Stephen Hsu, founder of SafeWeb, which later stopped support and distribution of the tool. The software was developed using seed money from the CIA, and TriangleBoy was supported in part by the Voice of America as a way for Chinese readers to be able to reach the VoA website while bypassing China's Great Firewall.
