= Hermann Nicolai =

German physicist (born 1952)

Hermann Nicolai (born 11 July 1952 in Friedberg) is a German theoretical physicist and director emeritus at the Max Planck Institute for Gravitational Physics in Potsdam-Golm.

== Education and career ==
At Karlsruhe Institute of Technology, Hermann Nicolai, beginning in 1971, studied physics and mathematics with a Diplom in 1975 with a doctorate in 1978 under the supervision of Julius Wess. At Heidelberg University, Nicolai was an assistant in theoretical physics from 1978 to 1979. From 1979 to 1986, he worked at CERN in Geneva as a staff member in the theory department. In 1983 he received his habilitation at Heidelberg University. He was a professor (with civil service grade C3) of theoretical physics at Karlsruhe Institute of Technology from 1986 to 1988 and from 1988 to 1997 a professor (with civil service grade C4) of theoretical physics at the University of Hamburg. At the Max Planck Institute for Gravitational Physics, Nicolai was head of the department "Quantum Gravity and Unified Field Theories" and a director from 1997 to 2020, when he retired as director emeritus. Between 2017 and 2024, he led the research group "Exceptional Quantum Gravity" at the Max Planck Institute for Gravitational Physics, which was funded by an Advanced Grant of the European Research Council.

He was a member of the editorial board of Communications in Mathematical Physics from 1993 to 1995. Then, from 1998 to 2003 the editor-in-chief of the journal Classical and Quantum Gravity, and from 2006 to 2011 the editor-in-chief of the journal General Relativity and Gravitation, jointly with George Ellis.

In 1991, Nicolai received the Otto-Klung-Award (now called the Klung Wilhelmy Science Award), in 2010 the Albert Einstein Medal, and was awarded the 2012 Gay-Lussac-Humboldt Prize. He was appointed an honorary professor at the Humboldt University of Berlin and in 2005 at the Leibniz University Hannover. In 2016 he was awarded an honorary doctorate from Chalmers University of Technology.

Nicolai's research in the context of unified theories, cosmology, and the Big Bang has been covered repeatedly in various media and was featured on a 1999 cover of Der Spiegel.

== Research ==
Nicolai's research is in the fields of supersymmetry, supergravity, and particle and astroparticle physics, M-theory, cosmic singularities, and general relativity.

=== Supersymmetry ===
In 1976 and 1977 Hermann Nicolai was the first to introduce supersymmetric quantum mechanics. In this work Nicolai formulated a supersymmetric lattice model with only Majorana fermions, similar to a supersymmetric version of the Sachdev–Ye–Kitaev model.

Nicolai showed in 1980 that supersymmetric theories can be formulated without anti-commuting variables, in terms of a purely bosonic functional measure. This is achieved by integrating out fermions (using Berezinian integration) and a non-linear and non-local field transformation of the bosonic fields. This transformation became known as Nicolai map, which has recently become an area of active research with applications from quantum mechanics to multi-dimensional supersymmetric Yang–Mills theory, and most recently, supergravity.

=== Supergravity ===
In 1982 Nicolai and Bernard de Wit derived the SO(8) gauged "N = 8 supergravity theory", which is the maximally supersymmetryic theory in four space-time dimensions with one graviton and no particles with a spin greater than 2. This is the most symmetric field theoretic extension of Einstein’s theory of general relativity and a candidate for the unification of gravity and matter into a unified theory of quantum gravity.

In the late 1980s H. Nicolai derived the first example of an integrable locally supersymmetric theory, by explicitly constructing a linear system for the bosonic and fermionic equations of motion of maximal supergravity in two space-time dimensions. With de Wit he also helped understand how gauged N = 8 supergravity is embedded in N = 1 supergravity in eleven dimensions, by consistently compactifying eleven-dimensional supergravity on the seven-dimensional sphere S^{7} and correctly reproducing all non-linearities of the low-energy theory. New, general formulas for uplifting four-dimensional solutions to higher dimensions were derived.

In the 2000s, H. Samtleben and H. Nicolai introduced the embedding tensor formalism which allows a unified description of gauged supergravities of any type and in any space-time dimension, and which pointed to the existence of a new type of supergravity beyond d = 11. they also constructed a large class of gauged supergravity theories in three dimensions and their symmetries.

=== Particle physics ===
Starting in the late 2000s, Hermann Nicolai and Krzysztof A. Meissner explored how conformal symmetry can ensure that the Standard Model can remain viable up to the Planck scale. This proposal is consistent with the fact that no hints of low energy (N=1) supersymmetry have been found, despite decades of dedicated collider searches.

Later, Meissner and Nicolai explored a proposal made by Murray Gell-Mann in 1983 to explain the existence of three, and only three, generations of quarks and leptons from maximal supergravity. Their work can in principle explain the existence of the fermions observed in the Standard Model without superpartners, and why there can be only three generations of them.

Nicolai's and Meissner's work led them to predict the existence of supermassive gravitinos, hypothetical partners to the graviton with spin 3/2. Supermassive gravitinos are Dark matter candidates. They could also explain the origin of primordial black holes via the condensation and gravitational collapse of "lumps" of supermassive gravitinos in the early radiation-dominated era. With other colleagues, they proposed to search for supermassive gravitinos with the JUNO and DUNE underground detectors. They calculated the expected signatures of gravitinos in those detectors and showed that they significantly differ from the expected neutrino signals.

=== M-theory and E10 ===
M-theory is an attempt to mathematically unify all consistent versions of superstring theory. In 1988 de Wit, Hoppe, and Nicolai showed that maximally supersymmetric SU(∞) matrix theory can serve as a first concrete mathematical model of M-theory, following the earlier discovery that the eleven-dimensional supermembrane is the maximally extended theory of a supersymmetric relativistic extended object. They constructed the theory as the N→∞ limit of a maximally supersymmetric quantum mechanical SU(N) matrix model. Subsequently it was shown that the associated Hamiltonian has a continuous spectrum, unlike the purely bosonic model.

In the early 2000s Nicolai did research on the roles of exceptional Lie groups and their role in M-theory. Together with Günyadin and Koepsell, Nicolai worked on conformal and quasiconformal realizations of exceptional Lie groups. They obtained the first explicit geometric realization of the maximal rank finite-dimensional exceptional Lie group $E_{8}$, and discussed possible applications to supergravity and M-theory. By studying the BKL limit, Damour, Henneaux, Kleinschmidt and Nicolai highlighted the central role of the maximal rank hyperbolic Kac-Moody symmetry $E_ {10}$ as a candidate symmetry for the unification of the fundamental interactions, in a concrete framework of emergent spacetime. This model is supposed to replace spacetime dynamics and its concomitant symmetries in the Planck regime close to the singularity, where classical notions of spacetime are expected to break down. This would imply a purely algebraic description of the universe in cosmological spacetime regions near the singularity (within the Planck time) using the $E_{10}$-symmetry with spacetime symmetries and space-time based quantum field theory as emergent phenomena. This work also hints at the emergence of a mathematically well-defined non-computability near the cosmological singularity, which would make it impossible to reach the beginning of time in a finite number of mathematical steps.

In 2022, Kleinschmidt and Nicolai showed that in maximal d = 11 supergravity the Wheeler-DeWitt Hamiltonian for the bosonic part coincides with the unique quadratic Casimir operator of $E_ {10}$ at low levels. This eliminates quantization ambiguities in conventional approaches to define the Wheeler-DeWitt equation and in principle allows constructing (infinitely many) observables. They also studied various finite-dimensional truncations to show that the Wheeler-DeWitt functional generically vanishes on classical singularities. This provides non-trivial examples for DeWitt’s proposed mechanism for the quantum resolution of space-time singularities.

=== General relativity ===
D. Korotkin and H. Nicolai explored the Ernst equation on an arbitrary Riemannian surface. The Ernst equation was already known to help with the construction of exact stationary axisymmetric solutions of Einstein's equations. As a particular application this work derived a periodic analog of the Schwarzschild solution. In the 2000s, with T. Damour and M. Henneaux, Nicolai investigated the behavior of the Einstein equations close to a space-like gravitational singularity such as the Big Bang, following pioneering work of Belinsky, Khalatnikov and Lifshitz (BKL). They reformulated general relativity in terms of chaotic cosmological billiard systems that allow a general analysis of such singularities for spacetimes of any dimensionality and any menu of matter fields.

== See also ==
- Hierarchy problem
