= David Tong =

David Tong may refer to:

- David Tong (physicist), British physicist
- David Tong (footballer) (born 1955), English footballer
