= Leonardo Senatore =

Leonardo Senatore may refer to:

- Leonardo Senatore (rugby union)
- Leonardo Senatore (physicist)
