= Center for Mathematics and Theoretical Physics =

Italian research institute

The Center for Mathematics and Theoretical Physics (CMTP) is an Italian institution supporting research in mathematics and theoretical physics. The CMTP was founded on November 17, 2009 as an interdepartmental research center of the three Roman universities: Sapienza, Tor Vergata and Roma Tre. The CMTP's director is Roberto Longo, from the Mathematics Department of Tor Vergata University, and its scientific secretaries are Alberto De Sole, from Sapienza University, and Alessandro Giuliani, from Roma Tre University.

The center does not have a permanent location; however, it is temporarily hosted in Tor Vergata's Mathematics Department.

The aim of the CMTP, according to its Web site, is to "take advantage of the high quality and wide spectrum of research in mathematical physics presently carried on in Roma [sic] in order to promote cross fertilization of mathematics and theoretical physics at the highest level by fostering creative interactions of leading experts from both subjects."

== Activities of the center ==
The CMTP promotes scientific research by organizing workshops, congresses, and periods of thematic research; sending invitations to scientists; and assigning study grants. The CMTP's goal is to attract foreign scientists of international prestige and young talented foreigners to Rome by offering a natural place for scientific education and a base of cultural interchange with other scientific centers abroad.

The opening activity of the center was to present the Seminal Interactions between Mathematics and Physics conference hosted by the Accademia Nazionale dei Lincei in Rome. The invited speakers counted, among others, four fields medalists; Alain Connes, Andrei Okounkov, Stanislav Smirnov and C. Villani; and an Abel Prize winner, Isadore Singer. As part of the conference, the center organized two evening public lectures for the general audience, held by Ludvig Faddeev and Singer.

Among its activities, the center runs the Levi Civita colloquia.

== See also ==
- Institute for Theoretical Physics (disambiguation)
- Center for Theoretical Physics (disambiguation)
