= Yamuna Kachru =

American linguist

- Born: 5 March 1933; Purulia, West Bengal, India
- Died: 19 April 2013 (aged 80); Urbana, Illinois, U.S.
- Education: Deccan College; University of London
- Occupations: Linguist; professor
- Spouse: Braj Kachru
- Children: 2, including Shamit Kachru

Yamuna Kachru (यमुना काचरु, (Devanagari)) (5 March 1933 in Purulia, West Bengal, India - 19 April 2013 in Urbana, Illinois) was Professor Emerita of Linguistics at University of Illinois Urbana-Champaign.

== Career ==
Kachru studied linguistics at Deccan College in Poona, India, and then at the School of Oriental and African Studies, University of London (SOAS). She earned her PhD at SOAS in 1965 with a dissertation entitled A Transformational Treatment of Hindi Verbal Syntax, the first in-depth analysis of the Hindi language to utilize the Chomskyan framework. She taught Hindi at SOAS until she moved to the University of Illinois (UIUC) with her husband Braj Kachru in 1966. She held an academic position at UIUC for over 30 years, retiring in 1999.

She wrote a grammar of Hindi based on developments in modern linguistics, and was considered a leading international authority on the language's grammar. She published a series of research articles in applied linguistics, mostly on the problem of linguistic creativity. Kachru also worked on the area of second language acquisition.

Kachru was from the establishment of the field a leading scholar of world Englishes, and was a co-founder of the International Association of World Englishes.

== Awards ==
Kachru was the 2004 recipient of the Padmabhushan Dr. Moturi Satyanarayan Award

In September 2006 she received the Presidential Award from the President of India Dr. A. P. J. Abdul Kalam for her contributions to the study of Hindi language.

== Personal life ==
She was the wife of fellow linguist Braj Kachru, with whom she frequently collaborated. They had two children: Stanford professor Shamit Kachru and physician Amita Kachru.

== Books ==
- "An Introduction to Hindi Syntax" (1967)
- "Aspects of Hindi Grammar" (1980)
- "Intermediate Hindi" (with Rajeshwari Pandharipande, 1983)
- "Hindi" (a grammar, 2006)
- "World Englishes in Asian Contexts" (with Cecil Nelson, 2006)
- "Handbook of World Englishes" (edited with Braj Kachru and Cecil Nelson, 2007)
- "Cultures, Contexts, and World Englishes" (co-authored with Larry Smith, 2008)
- "Language in South Asia" (edited with Braj Kachru and S.N. Sridhar, 2008).
