= Surendra Gambhir =

Indian writer

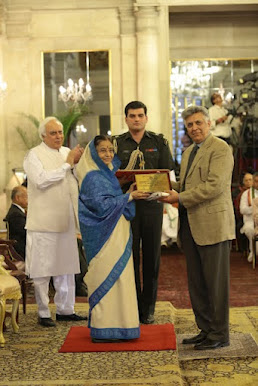
Dr. Surendra Gambhir receiving Padmabhushan Dr. Moturi Satyanarayan Award by Pratibha Devisingh Patil

Surendra Gambhir is a United States-based Indian author, writer and Adjunct Associate Professor, Department of South Asia Studies.

== Awards ==
He received Padmabhushan Dr. Moturi Satyanarayan Award in 2009 by Pratibha Devisingh Patil, President of India. He also received the Presidential Award in June 2012.
