= Leonardo Senatore (physicist) =

Italian theoretical physicist

- Education: Scuola Normale Superiore di Pisa (2003); MIT (PhD, 2006)
- Awards: New Horizons Prize (2016)
- Scientific career
- Fields: Cosmology
- Workplaces: Harvard; Institute for Advanced Study; Stanford; SLAC; ETH Zurich
- Doctoral advisor: Nima Arkani-Hamed; Alan Guth

Leonardo Senatore is an Italian theoretical physicist and professor at the Stanford Institute for Theoretical Physics, the Kavli Institute for Particle Astrophysics and Cosmology, and SLAC. He was recently appointed professor at ETH Zurich.

== Biography ==
Senatore initially studied aerospace engineering, before earning a Laurea in Theoretical Physics from the Scuola Normale Superiore di Pisa in 2003. He continued his studies at the MIT Center for Theoretical Physics, earning a Ph.D. in 2006 under the supervision of Nima Arkani-Hamed and Alan Guth. He then held joint postdoctoral positions at Harvard and the Institute for Advanced Study.

Senatore's research focuses on theoretical cosmology. Some of his contributions have included work applying effective field theory techniques to cosmology, theoretical insights regarding inflation, and his studies of large-scale structure in the universe. He has also worked on analysis of data from experiments like WMAP, which studied the cosmic microwave background, and connections of string theory to cosmology.

Senatore won an Early Career Award from the U.S. Department of Energy in 2012 for his work, as well as a New Horizons in Physics Prize in 2016 "for outstanding contributions to theoretical cosmology."

== Honors ==
- New Horizons in Physics Prize (2015)
- Department of Energy Early Career Award (2012)
- Terman Award, Stanford (2010)
