= Sigrid Elschot =

American academic

Sigrid Elschot (born 1971) is a professor in the Department of Aeronautics and Astronautics at Stanford University. Her primary research interest is the space environment with particular focus on meteoroids, meteors, and orbital debris, and their interaction with spacecraft and spacecraft operations.

== Career ==
Professor Elschot's research at Stanford University explores the effects of space weather on spacecraft and the role of electromagnetic waves in satellite communications. Her work supports space situational awareness by advancing remote sensing techniques using both satellite-based sensors and ground-based radar. She investigates plasma interactions relevant to signal transmission, as well as hypervelocity impacts on spacecraft using experimental methods such as dust accelerators and light-gas guns, complemented by Particle-In-Cell simulations. Additionally, she utilizes radar observations to study space debris and meteoroid populations and examines hypersonic plasma phenomena associated with atmospheric re-entry.

Prior to joining Stanford, she was a technical staff member at MIT Lincoln Laboratory and a project leader at Los Alamos National Laboratory. She was a member of two National Research Council panels, in 2010 examining options for detecting and countering near-Earth objects, and in 2011 assessing NASA's meteoroid and orbital debris programs. She also has contributed to the Hoover Institution through involvement in panels on national security and as a subject matter expert in space for their Stanford Emerging Technology Review.

In 2018 she was selected as a NIAC fellow for her research titled "Meteoroid Impact Detection for Exploration of Asteroids (MIDEA)", and in 2021 she was selected as a NIAC fellow for her research titled "Exploring Uranus through Sustained CubeSat Activity Through Transmitted Electromagnetic Radiation (SCATTER)". These studies explore mission concepts for potential exploration of asteroid composition and ice giant magnetospheres using swarms of small satellites coordinated around a mothership.

== Awards and honors ==
- In 2010, she won an NSF Career Award and a Hellman Faculty Fellowship award for her meteor research.
- In 2013 she was selected for a DoE Early Career Award for her work on hypervelocity impact plasmas, and also awarded a Presidential Early Career Award for Scientists and Engineers.
- She was the inaugural Science Guest of Honor at the ArmadilloCon science fiction and fantasy literary convention in 2014.
- In 2017 she was recognized by the American Geophysical Union with the Space Physics and Aeronomy Richard Carrington (SPARC) Education and Public Outreach Award. for significant and outstanding impact on students' and the public's understanding of geophysical science through education and outreach activities.
- Asteroid 11009 Sigridclose, discovered by astronomer Schelte Bus at the Siding Spring Observatory in 1981, was named in her honor. The official naming citation was published by the Minor Planet Center on 13 April 2017 (M.P.C. 103977).

== Television ==
In 2011, Professor Elschot co-hosted season three of National Geographic Channel's Known Universe documentary series along with David E. Kaplan, Andy Howell, Michael J. Massimino, and Steve Jacobs. She was interviewed on the Nova ScienceNow Can We Make It to Mars? episode in 2011 and the Nova Chasing Pluto special in 2015.
