= The Bit Player =

2019 documentary film

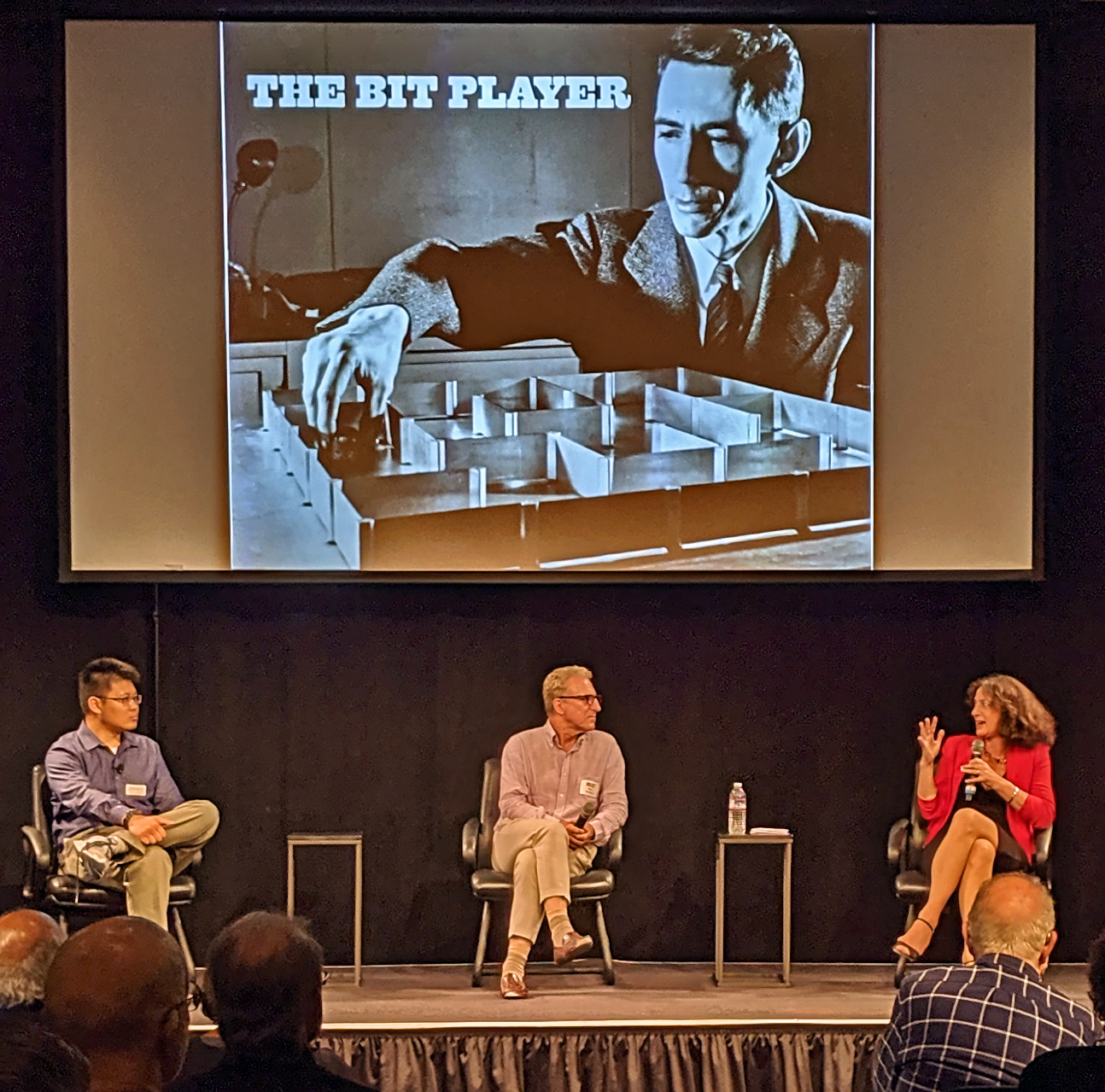
- The panel discussion after the August 2, 2019, screening of The Bit Player at the Computer History Museum in Mountain View, California. At the right, Andrea Goldsmith, a professor at Stanford and representative of the IEEE Information Theory Society. Center, Mark Levinson, director and producer of the documentary. Left, Hansen Hsu of the Computer History Museum, moderator.
- Directed by: Mark Levinson
- Written by: Mark Levinson
- Produced by: Mark Levinson
- Cinematography: Claudia Raschke
- Edited by: Tim Sternberg
- Production company: IEEE Information Theory Society
- Release date: May 29, 2019 (World Science Festival)
- Country: United States
- Language: English

The Bit Player is a 2019 documentary film created to celebrate the 2016 centenary of the birth of Claude Shannon, the "father of information theory". The film was produced and directed by Mark Levinson, in cooperation with the IEEE Information Theory Society and the IEEE Foundation.

The film premiered at the World Science Festival in New York City on May 29, 2019, and was screened for a large audience at the IEEE Information Theory Society's meeting in Vail, Colorado, on June 19, 2019.

A review in Physics Today calls it "not quite a documentary" and "a delightful new film". The film was named "best in show" in Realscreen's MIPTV Picks 2019.
