= Institute of Nuclear Physics =

Institute of Nuclear Physics may refer to:

- Budker Institute of Nuclear Physics, Russia
- Max Planck Institute for Nuclear Physics, Germany
- Nuclear Physics Institute of the Czech Academy of Sciences
- Saha Institute of Nuclear Physics, India
- Skobeltsyn Institute of Nuclear Physics, Moscow State University Russia
- Pakistan Institute of Nuclear Physics, Pakistan
- Institute of Nuclear Physics, Kazakhstan
