= Lina Necib =

Tunisian-American astrophysicist

Lina Necib is a theoretical astrophysicist known for the discovery of the Nyx stream of stars in the Milky Way. Her research combines simulation, astronomical observations, and machine learning to infer the distribution and motion of dark matter in the Milky Way. Originally from Tunisia, she emigrated to the United States for her education, and works at the Massachusetts Institute of Technology (MIT) as an associate professor of physics.

== Education and career ==
Necib became interested in astrophysics as a child, after watching the film Contact. She moved to the US in 2008, and became a double major in mathematics and physics at Boston University, where she graduated in 2012. She completed a Ph.D. at the Massachusetts Institute of Technology in 2017, supervised by particle physicist Jesse Thaler.

She became a postdoctoral researcher at the California Institute of Technology from 2017 to 2020, with the support of a Sherman Fairchild Fellowship. It was during this work that she switched her research focus from particle physics to astrophysics, and she found the Nyx stream as the unexpected outcome of an attempt to catalog stars of extragalactic origins by applying machine learning to Gaia data. In 2020, she continued her postdoctoral research as a Presidential Fellow at the University of California, Irvine. She returned to MIT as a faculty member in physics in 2021.

== Recognition ==
Necib was the 2023 recipient of the George E. Valley Jr. Prize of the American Physical Society, given in recognition of "the discovery of a massive, previously unknown stellar structure that may have shaped the history of the Milky Way, and the development of groundbreaking new methods to study our Galaxy's dark matter halo and growth history". She received a Sloan Research Fellowship in 2024.
