= Mike Williams (physicist) =

American particle physicist

Michael Williams
- Education: Carnegie Mellon University; Saint Vincent College
- Scientific career
- Fields: Particle physics Machine Learning
- Institutions: Massachusetts Institute of Technology; Imperial College London
- Thesis: Measurement of the differential cross section and spin density matrix elements along with a partial wave analysis for gamma p to omega p using CLAS at Jefferson Lab
- Doctoral advisor: Curtis Meyer

Michael Williams is an experimental particle physicist, faculty member at MIT, and inaugural Deputy Director of the NSF AI Institute for Artificial Intelligence and Fundamental Interactions (IAIFI).

== Biography ==
Williams grew up in suburban Pittsburgh, a city he remained in for his undergraduate and graduate studies. Initially unsure of what he wanted to study or pursue as a career, Williams double-majored in physics and mathematics summa cum laude at Saint Vincent College in 2001 before earning his M.S. and Ph.D. degrees at Carnegie Mellon University under the supervision of Curtis Meyer in 2007. He worked as a postdoctoral fellow at Imperial College London from 2008 until his appointment as a professor in the Laboratory for Nuclear Science at the Massachusetts Institute of Technology in 2012. A tenured professor in the MIT Department of Physics, Williams is also an affiliate member of the MIT Statistics and Data Science Center and the MIT Institute for Data, Systems, and Society.

Through his experimental particle physics research, Williams primarily focuses on "searching for as-yet-unknown particles and forces, possibly components of the dark sector of matter, and on studying largely unexplored emergent properties of QCD." Williams leads the MIT group working on the LHCb experiment, a detector at CERN's Large Hadron Collider (LHC) named for its focus on the bottom quark. He also works on the GlueX experiment at Thomas Jefferson National Accelerator Facility (JLab), which studies a class of particles called mesons. Notably, Williams is also the inaugural deputy director of IAIFI, a new National Science Foundation AI Institute given $20 million in initial funding, and works on the development and use of AI tools for furthering accelerator physics research.

In connection with his work on IAIFI, Williams and colleague Jesse Thaler also created and co-chair a new degree program at MIT, an interdisciplinary PhD in physics, statistics, and data science.

== Honors ==
- Early Career Award, US Department of Energy (2013)
- Jefferson Laboratory Thesis Prize (2008)
- Guy C. Berry Graduate Research Award, Carnegie Mellon University (2006)
