= Braj Kachru =

Indian linguist (1932–2016)

- Born: Braj Bihari Kachru; 15 May 1932; Srinagar, Kashmir and Jammu, British India
- Died: 29 July 2016 (aged 84); Urbana, Illinois, U.S.
- Occupations: Linguist, author, journalist
- Spouse: Yamuna Kachru
- Children: Amita Kachru; Shamit Kachru
- Writing career
- Language: Kashmiri, Hindi, English
- Notable work: The Alchemy of English (1986)
- Notable awards: Joint First Prize, Duke of Edinburgh Book Competition (1987)

Braj Bihari Kachru (15 May 1932 – 29 July 2016) was an Indian-American linguist. He was Jubilee Professor of Linguistics at the University of Illinois at Urbana-Champaign. He published studies on the Kashmiri language.

== Personal life ==
Braj Bihari Kachru was a friend of Kashmiri poet and writer Zinda Kaul Masterji. Lala Sahab and his friends and colleagues had discussions on politics, literature and philosophy at his house. During their visits, Braj had the opportunity to interact with Masterji and his father's other teacher colleagues.

In 1962 Kachru gained a PhD in Linguistics from the University of Edinburgh. His wife was fellow linguist Yamuna Kachru. Their son, Shamit Kachru, is a string theorist and professor at Stanford University.

Braj Bihari Kachru died on 29 July 2016.

== Career ==
He researched in the fields of World Englishes and Kashmiri language and published several books and research papers related to the field.

=== Scholar and educationist ===
At the University of Illinois, Braj headed the Department of Linguistics (1968–79), directed the Division of English as an International Language (1985–91), and was director of the Center for Advanced Study (June 1996 – January 2000). At the Linguistic Institute of the Linguistic Society of America, he was appointed director in 1978. He was president of American Association of Applied Linguistics (1984). He was named Jubilee Professor of Liberal Arts and Sciences at Illinois in 1992. In 1998, he became the Sir Edward Youde Memorial Fund Visiting Professor at Hong Kong University. He went on to become the president of the International Association for World Englishes (1997–99), and eventually the Honorary Fellow of the Central Institute of English and Foreign Languages, now English and Foreign Languages University in Hyderabad, India, in 2001.

=== Writer and author ===
Kachru has been on the editorial board of Journal of Multilingual and Multicultural development, International Journal of the Sociology of Languages, Asian Englishes, and Linguistics and the Human Sciences. Along with authoring The Alchemy of English: The Spread, Functions and Models of Non-Native Englishes, Kachru is also the associate editor for Contributor to the Cambridge History of the English Language and the acclaimed The Oxford Companion to the English Language.

== The circles of English ==
To better understand the use of English in different countries, Kachru conceived the idea of three concentric circles of the language.

The inner circle represents the traditional bases of English: the United Kingdom, the United States, Australia, New Zealand, Ireland, anglophone Canada and South Africa and some of the Caribbean territories. The total number of English speakers in the inner circle is as high as 380 million, of whom some 120 million are outside the United States.

Next comes the outer circle, which includes countries where English is not the native tongue, but is important for historical reasons and plays a part in the nation's institutions, either as an official language or otherwise. This circle includes India, Nigeria, the Philippines, Bangladesh, Pakistan, Malaysia, Tanzania, Kenya, non-Anglophone South Africa and Canada, etc. The total number of English speakers in the outer circle is estimated to range from 150 million to 300 million.

Finally, the expanding circle encompasses those countries where English plays no historical or governmental role, but where it is nevertheless widely used as a foreign language or lingua franca. This includes much of the rest of the world's population, including China, Russia, Japan, most of Europe, Korea, Egypt, Indonesia, and other nations. The total in this expanding circle is the most difficult to estimated because English may be employed for specific, limited purposes, usually business English. The estimates of these users range from 100 million to one billion.

The inner circle (UK, US, etc.) is 'norm-providing'. That means that English language norms are developed in these countries – English is the first language there. The outer circle (mainly New Commonwealth countries) is 'norm-developing'. The expanding circle, which includes much of the rest of the world, is 'norm-dependent' because it relies on the standards set by native speakers in the inner circle.

== Bibliography ==
- The alchemy of English: the spread, functions, and models of non-native Englishes, University of Illinois Press, 1990 ISBN 0-252-06172-1
- World Englishes: critical concepts in linguistics, Volume 4, Publisher: Taylor & Francis, 2006, ISBN 0-415-31509-3
