= Richard Blankenbecler =

American physicist

- Born: 1933 (age 92–93); Kingsport,_Tennessee
- Citizenship: American
- Education: Miami_University (BA) Stanford_University (Ph.D.)
- Scientific career
- Doctoral advisor: Sidney_Drell
- Other academic advisors: Marvin_Goldberger Sam_Treiman
- Doctoral students: Thomas Neff

Richard Blankenbecler (born 1933, in Kingsport, Tennessee) is an American theoretical particle physicist. He is a professor emeritus with the SLAC Theory Group at the Stanford Linear Accelerator Center (SLAC) at Stanford University.

In 1954, Blankenbecler received his B.A. in physics from Miami University and in 1958 he received his doctorate from Stanford University. After his Ph.D., he became a postdoc at Princeton University and a Sloan Research Fellowship in 1962. In 1963 he became assistant professor and in 1966 a full professor at Princeton where he collaborated with Marvin Goldberger and Sam Treiman where they worked on fundamental papers on quantum field theory. A Sloan Research Fellowship supported his work on dispersion relations and scattering amplitudes.

After Princeton in 1966, Blankenbecler moved to the University of California at Santa Barbara where he taught and did research on quantum field theory. He developed a formalism for carrying out Monte Carlo calculations in quantum field theories with both boson and fermion degrees of freedom. The Blankenbecler-Sugar equation provided a new formalism for scattering and production processes, is still in use as of 2025.

In 1969, Blankenbecler returned to the Stanford Linear Accelerator Center faculty in the SLAC Theory Group. With Sidney Drell, a simple high-energy expansion for bremsstrahlung was developed and applied to the problem of radiation from an extended target. In 1985 Boyanovsky and Blankenbecler reported on fractional charge and in 1976 Sivers, Brodsky and Blankenbecler published a comprehensive survey of Large Transverse Momentum Processes confronting theory (parton and non-parton models) with experiment.

Also in 1969, Blankenbecler spent one year at Paris-Saclay University to continue work on Coupled Boson-Fermion Systems.

At SLAC Blankenbecler was a member of the Reason Project that led indirectly to the first web site established in North America hosting the SPIRES database, designed as a physics database management system. In addition to published work in optical design, he also developed a Hamiltonian method for 3D image reconstruction. He also developed a low-dose pre-treatment protocol to minimize radiation damage for cancer patients and during radiation workers.

In 2000, Blankenbecler retired as emeritus professor at SLAC.

== Memberships and awards ==
- 1962 Sloan Research Fellowship
- 1964 American Physical Society Fellow
- 1979-1984 UCSB Kavli Institute for Theoretical Physics Advisory Board (Chairperson: 1982-1983)
