= Padmabhushan Dr. Moturi Satyanarayan Award =

Award for promotion of the Hindi language outside of India

Padmabhushan Dr. Moturi Satyanarayan Award पद्मभूषण डॉ. मोटूरि सत्यानारायण पुरस्कार
- Award for promotion of the Hindi Language
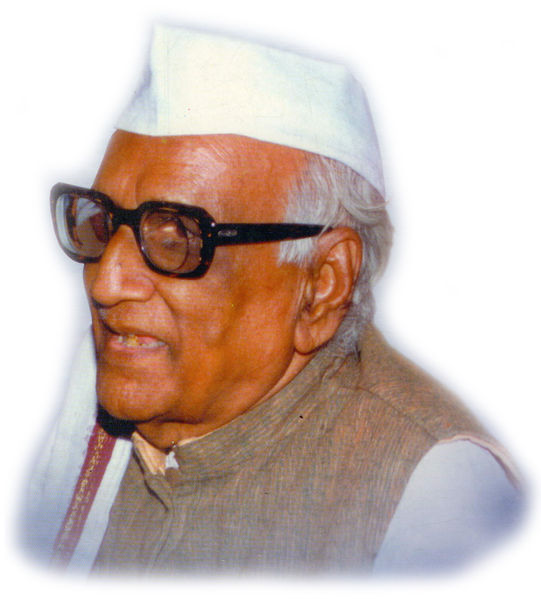
- Awarded for: Literary award in India
- Sponsored by: Kendriya Hindi Sansthan, Government of India
- First award: 2002 (Instituted in 1989)
- Final award: 2009

Highlights
- Total awarded: 8
- First winner: Shri. Harishankar 'Aadesh'
- Last winner: Dr. Surendra Gambhir

Padmabhushan Dr. Moturi Satyanarayan Award (Devnagari: पद्मभूषण डॉ. मोटूरि सत्यानारायण पुरस्कार) is a literary honor in India which Kendriya Hindi Sansthan, (Central Hindi Organization), Ministry of Human Resource Development, annually confers on writers of outstanding works in Hindi Literature. It is also a Hindi Sevi Samman and is given to number of Hindi experts for playing their important role in promoting the Hindi language.

== History ==
The award was established by Kendriya Hindi Sansthan in 1989 on the name of the Great Hindi Activist Moturi Satyanarayana. It was first awarded in the year 2002 to Shri. Harishankar 'Aadesh'.

== Honour ==
Padmabhushan Dr. Moturi Satyanarayan Award is awarded for Promotion of Hindi language in abroad every year by the President Of India.

== Recipients ==
Year	Name	Country
2002	Harishankar 'Aadesh'	Canada
2003	P. Jayaraman	America
2004	Pro. Yamuna Kachru	America
2005	Krishna Kishore	America
2006	Prem Lata Verma	Argentina
2007	Usha Priyamwada	America
2008	Purnima Varman	UAE
2009	Dr. Surendra Gambhir	America
2010	Madanlal Madhu	Russia
2011	Tejendra Sharma	United Kingdom
2012	Susham Bedi	America
2013		
2014		
2015		
2016		
2017	Dr Padmesh Gupta	United Kingdom
2017	Pushpita Awasthi	Netherlands
