= Bernhard Mistlberger =

Austrian theoretical physicist

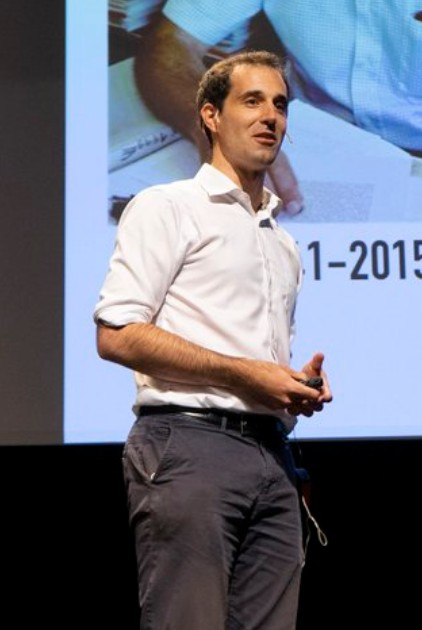
- Born: September 22, 1987 (age 38)
- Known for: Pioneering multi-loop Higgs Boson calculations
- Awards: Henry Primakoff Award for Early-Career Particle Physics (2022): Guido Altarelli Award (2022); Gribov Medal (2021); Wu-Ki Tung Award (2020)
- Scientific career
- Fields: Particle physics: Quantum chromodynamics
- Institutions: MIT Center for Theoretical Physics: SLAC National Accelerator Laboratory; Stanford University; CERN
- Doctoral advisor: Babis Anastasiou

Bernhard Mistlberger (born 22 September 1987) is an Austrian theoretical particle physicist known for his significant work in the area of quantum field theory. He is known for multi-loop calculations in quantum chromodynamics (QCD), including the first high-precision theoretical predictions of Higgs and vector boson production at the Large Hadron Collider.

== Career ==
Since 2020, Mistlberger has been a faculty member in the SLAC Theory Group at Stanford University. He was previously a Pappalardo Fellow in the Center for Theoretical Physics at MIT, and a research fellow at CERN.

In 2020, he was awarded the Wu-Ki Tung Award for Early-Career Research on QCD, for "pioneering theoretical computations of multi-loop radiative contributions for precision Higgs and electroweak physics at hadron colliders".

In 2021, he was awarded the European Physical Society’s Gribov Medal, for "groundbreaking contributions to multi-loop computations in QCD and to high-precision predictions of Higgs and vector boson production at hadron colliders".

In 2022, he won the American Physical Society's Henry Primakoff Award for Early-Career Particle Physics, for "groundbreaking contributions to high-precision quantum field theory, including the next-to-next-to-next-to-leading order QCD corrections to the production of Higgs and electroweak vector bosons at hadron colliders." In the same year, he also won the Guido Altarelli Award for "advancing the frontier of perturbative calculations in QCD to N3LO".
