= Lawrence John Hall =

Theoretical particle physicist

- Education: University of Oxford; Harvard University (PhD)
- Awards: Sloan Research Fellow; APS Fellow
- Scientific career
- Fields: Particle physics
- Workplaces: University of California, Berkeley; Harvard University
- Academic advisors: Howard Georgi
- Doctoral students: Nima Arkani-Hamed; Stephen Hsu

Lawrence John Hall is a theoretical particle physicist and professor at the University of California, Berkeley and the Berkeley Center for Theoretical Physics.

== Biography ==
Hall received his bachelor's degree from Oxford in 1977 and his Ph.D. from Harvard in 1981 with Howard Georgi. He was a Miller Fellow at Berkeley and an assistant professor at Harvard where he was a Sloan Foundation Fellow, before becoming professor at Berkeley in 1983, where he won a Presidential Young Investigator Award.

Hall is notable for his theoretical contributions to a wide span of research topics such as physics beyond the Standard Model, including supersymmetry and dark matter, in addition to his work on the weak force, cosmology, and grand unified theories. He was named a Fellow of the American Physical Society in 1993 "for numerous original contributions to the phenomenology of weak interaction, supersymmetry and supergravity, and the physics of the early universe."

He supervised the doctoral thesis of Nima Arkani-Hamed (1994).
