= LeConte Hall =

- LeConte Hall, University of California
- U.S. National Register of Historic Places
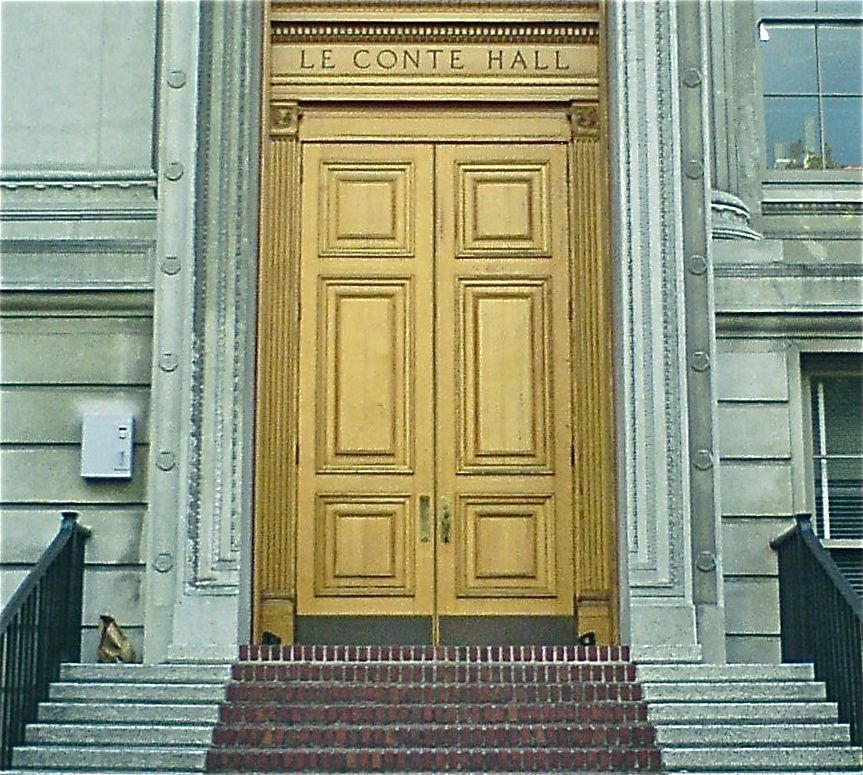
- West entrance

- Location within Oakland, California Location within California Location within the United States
- Location: Berkeley, California
- Coordinates: 37°52′21.42″N 122°15′22.55″W
- Area: less than one acre
- Built: 1924
- Architect: John Galen Howard
- NRHP reference No.: 04000622
- Added to NRHP: July 6, 2004

LeConte Hall is the former name of a building on the campus of the University of California, Berkeley, which is home to the physics department. LeConte Hall was one of the largest physics buildings in the world at the time it was opened in 1924, and was also the site of the first atom collider, built by Ernest O. Lawrence in 1931.

The building was named in honor of the brothers Joseph and John LeConte, professors of Physics and Geology, who were respectively the first and third presidents of the university. Their last name was removed from the building in 2020 due to their white supremacist views. As of 2021, the university has not decided on a permanent name.

== History ==
In 1924, the university opened LeConte Hall in order to accommodate an enlarged physics department, and to support the hiring of new, talented faculty. One of the newly hired faculty was Ernest Lawrence, who joined the department in 1928. Lawrence, together with students M. S. Livingston and David Sloan built an 11-inch cyclotron and installed it in room 325 LeConte. The device was the first successful, functional cyclotron and produced a current of 1.22 MeV protons.

Lawrence set up the Radiation Laboratory ("Rad Lab") in the space between LeConte Hall and the Campanile. The lab was later moved up the hill and renamed Lawrence Berkeley Laboratory.

Another nuclear physicist, J. Robert Oppenheimer joined the department in the summer of 1929. Oppenheimer maintained an office, together with his group of students in room 219 LeConte. In 1942, Oppenheimer was appointed head of the fast neutron research group, and in the summer of that year, he invited the leading physicists of the time to discuss the theoretical aspects of developing an atomic weapon. The physicists and Oppenheimer's students, including Hans Bethe, John Van Vleck, Felix Bloch, and others, worked in the top floor of LeConte Hall and spent a month analyzing data. A plaque commemorating Oppenheimer and his students can be found outside of room 433.

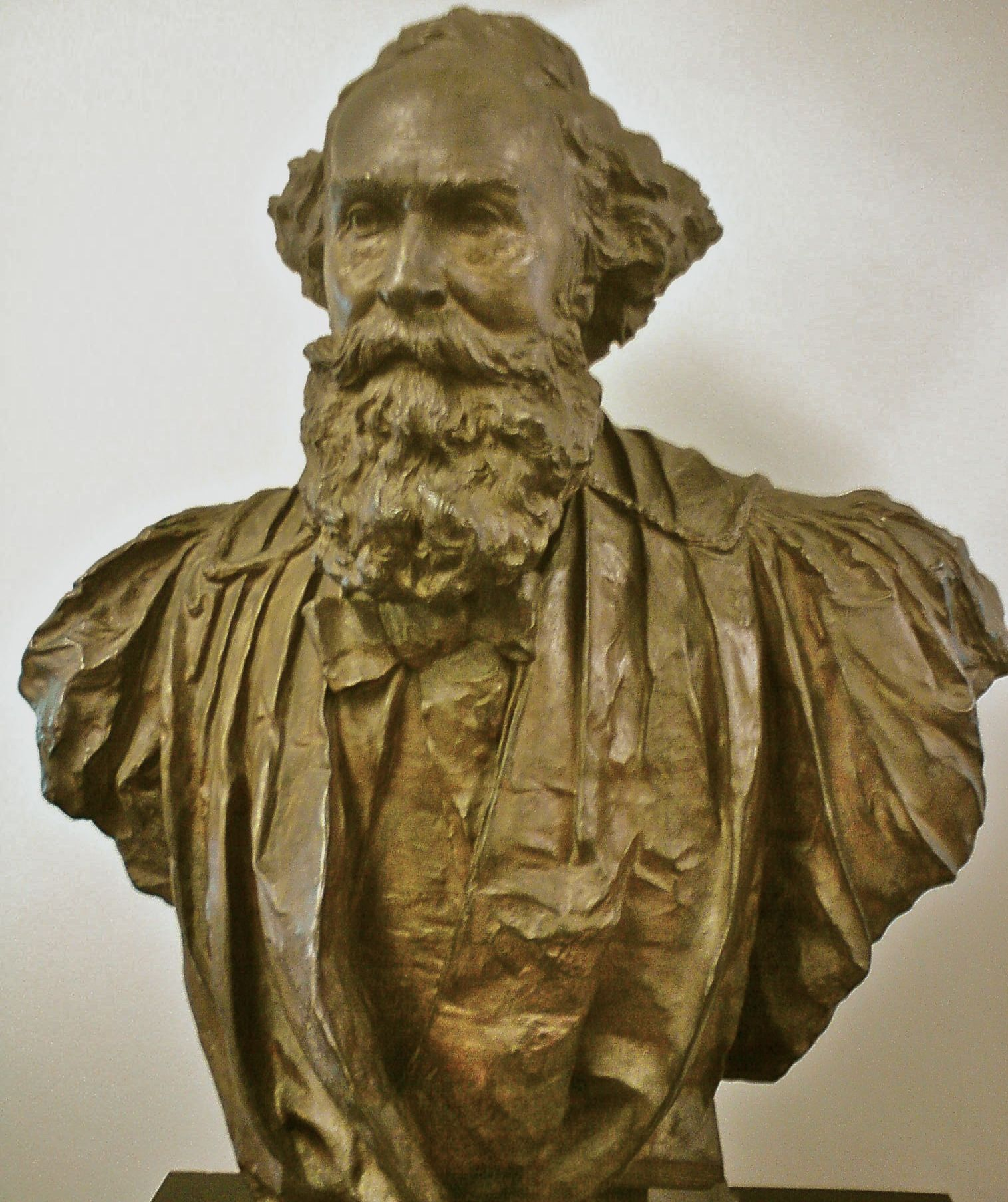
Bronze bust of John LeConte in Physics library, LeConte Hall

In 1950, an addition attached to LeConte Hall at its northwest corner was opened. In 2004, the original part of LeConte Hall was named to the National Register of Historic Places.

In 2006, the UC Berkeley campus completed a US$30.7 million renovation project, designed to update the LeConte Hall facilities as well as to provide seismic retrofitting. Being a historic landmark, an effort was made to preserve the original architecture as well as to restore original attributes, such as the historic skylight on the fourth floor, which houses the Berkeley Center for Theoretical Physics.

In 2020, the university removed the LeConte name from the building due to the LeConte brothers' support of white supremacy. As of 2021, it is temporarily called Physics South (for the original building) and Physics North (for the 1950 addition), while the university decides on a permanent name.

== Nobel Prizes ==
In 1939, Ernest Lawrence was awarded the Nobel Prize in Physics, the first time the award went to a Bay Area resident. Since then, LeConte Hall has been host to eight Physics Nobel Prize–winning faculty and four alumni.
