= Mina Aganagić =

Mathematical physicist

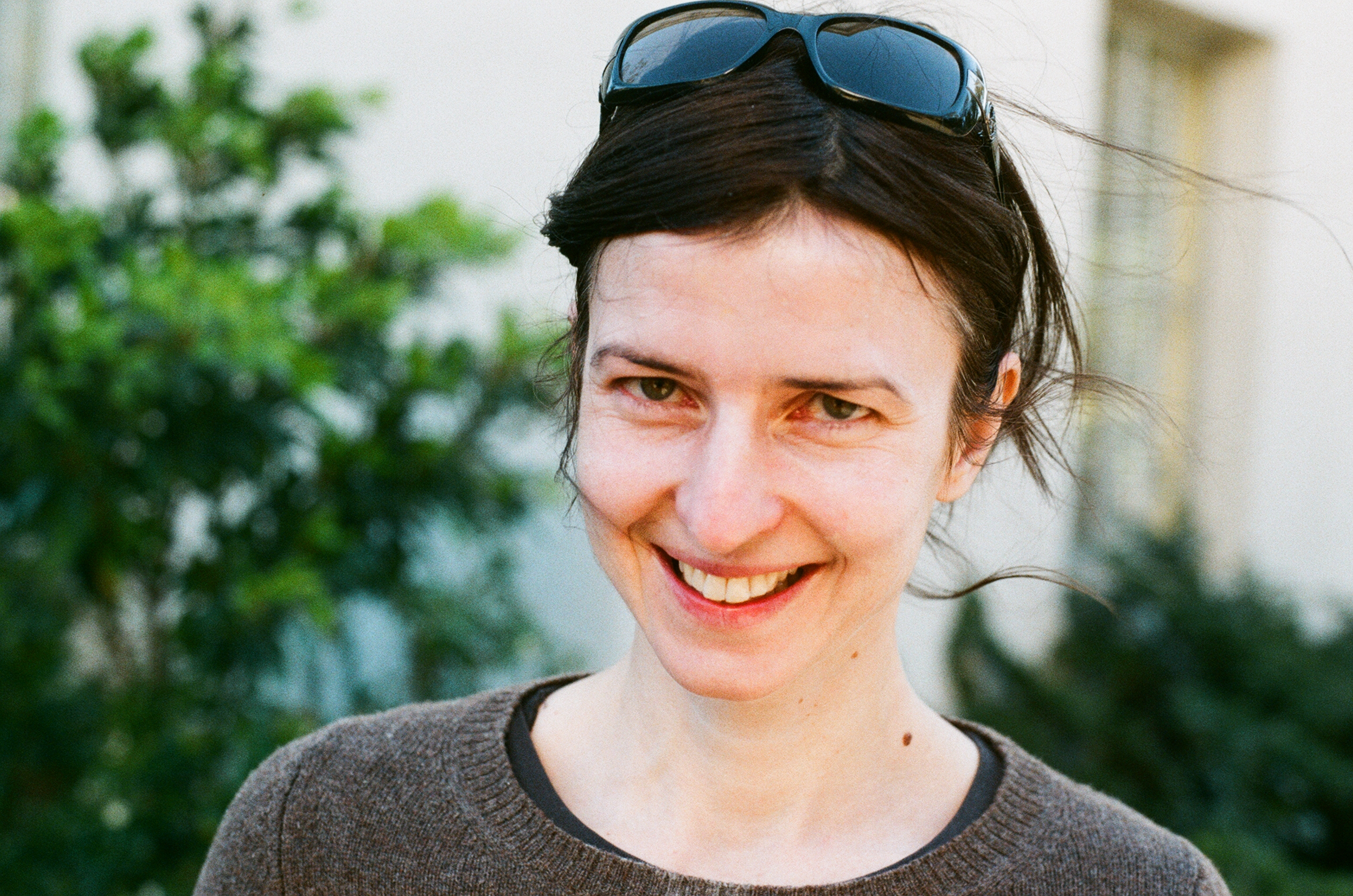
- Education: California Institute of Technology (Bachelor's degree, Ph.D.)
- Awards: Sloan Research Fellow (2004); APS Fellow (2016); Simons Investigator (2016–2021)
- Scientific career
- Fields: Mathematical physics String theory
- Workplaces: Harvard University; University of Washington; University of California, Berkeley
- Thesis: String theory on Calabi–Yau manifolds: Topics in geometry and physics (1999)
- Doctoral advisor: John Henry Schwarz

Mina Aganagić is a mathematical physicist who works as a professor at the Center for Theoretical Physics, the Department of Mathematics, and the Department of Physics at the University of California, Berkeley.

== Career ==
Aganagić was raised in Sarajevo, Bosnia and Herzegovina, Yugoslavia. She has a bachelor's degree and a doctorate from the California Institute of Technology, in 1995 and 1999 respectively; her PhD advisor was John Henry Schwarz. She was a postdoctoral fellow at the Harvard University physics department from 1999 to 2003. She then joined the physics faculty at the University of Washington, where she became a Sloan Research Fellow and a DOE Outstanding Junior Investigator. She moved to UC Berkeley in 2004. In 2016 the Simons Foundation gave her a Simons Investigator Award and the same year American Physical Society had awarded her with its fellowship.
