= David Tong (physicist) =

British theoretical physicist

- Born: Crawley, West Sussex, England
- Education: University of Nottingham (BSc); King's College London (MSc); University of Wales, Swansea (PhD)
- Scientific career
- Fields: Theoretical physics
- Workplaces: University of Cambridge
- Thesis: Instantons, monopoles, and three dimensional gauge theories (1998)
- Doctoral advisor: Nicholas Dorey
- Website: davidtong.org

David Tong is a British theoretical physicist. He is a professor at the University of Cambridge, working in the Department of Applied Mathematics and Theoretical Physics (DAMTP). He is also a fellow of Trinity College, Cambridge. His research mainly concerns quantum field theory. He is the joint recipient of the 2008 Adams Prize and is currently a Simons Investigator. He is also known for his outreach activities and for his freely available lecture notes covering a wide range of topics in physics.

== Research and career ==
Tong grew up in Crawley, UK. He attended Hazelwick School before undertaking his undergraduate studies in Mathematical Physics at the University of Nottingham. He completed his MSc in Mathematics at King's College London, and his PhD in Theoretical Physics at Swansea University.

He held research positions at the Tata Institute of Fundamental Research (TIFR), Mumbai, at King's College London and at Columbia University. Between 2001 and 2004 he was a Pappalardo Fellow at MIT Center for Theoretical Physics. He joined the faculty at Cambridge in 2004.

Tong works on quantum field theory and its application to different areas of physics. His early work was on solitons and includes the discovery (with Amihay Hanany) of a vortex solution in supersymmetric Yang-Mills theories. With Eva Silverstein and Mohsen Alishahia, he proposed a new, predictive mechanism for cosmic inflation based on the Dirac–Born–Infeld (DBI) action which helped motivate more systematic analyses of primordial non-Gaussianity. In work with Andreas Karch, he uncovered a web of dualities in 3d gauge theories.

Tong is known for his widely watched videos on theoretical physics, including a Royal Institution lecture on quantum field theory, and a Quanta Magazine primer on the Standard Model.

== Textbooks ==
David Tong has published books based on his theoretical physics lectures

- Volume 1: Classical Mechanics
- Volume 2: Electromagnetism
- Volume 3: Quantum Mechanics
- Volume 4: Fluid Mechanics
