= Interdisciplinary Telecommunications Program =

Educational program in Colorado, United States

The Interdisciplinary Telecommunications Program (its acronym is ITP) was a part of the University of Colorado at Boulder and offered graduate degrees in telecommunications: a Doctor of Philosophy and Master of Science in Telecommunications and a Master of Engineering in Telecommunications. It was the oldest telecommunications program in the United States and was founded in 1971 by Frank S. Barnes (Engineering) and George Codding (deceased, International Relations). Since its inception, ITP took an interdisciplinary approach to telecommunications, involving the study of engineering, law, politics, economics and business. Over the course of the past 35 years, ITP has graduated approximately 2,000 alumni who are in various positions around the world as CEOs, government officials, and management.

In 2004, ITP founder Frank S. Barnes was awarded the prestigious Gordon Prize for having founded ITP due to its innovative character and the influence that it has had within academia and industry. As the first program of its kind in the United States, it broke ground for the many academic programs that followed. When Peterson's first started listing telecommunications programs in 1996, the director of ITP was asked to write the introduction on the topic for Peterson's publisher. There is no question that many other prominent university programs have been directly influenced by ITP. For further information, there is now a consortium of universities that teach the telecommunications discipline, known as ITERA.

== The New ITP ==
In 2019, ITP was incorporated into the Department of Computer Science. This merge resulted in ITP being separated into two individual degrees: 1) Network Engineering and 2) Technology, Cybersecurity and Policy (TCP). The hands-on, technical piece of ITP was branched to form a Professional Master's of Science in Network Engineering degree, and the cybersecurity focus of ITP was branched into a new degree (TCP). These new degrees build on the historical success of CU Boulder’s ITP, and are a well-recognized source of talented individuals for the communications industry, with employment success rates approaching 100%.

== Prominent alumni ==
- Sharon K. Black, ITP's first graduate (class of 1971) international lawyer, adjunct professor and author of the book Telecommunications Law in the Internet Age (ISBN 1-55860-546-0)
- Claus F. Kroeger, Senior Vice President, Operations, Cox Communications
- Michelle A. McClure, lawyer and partner at the Washington D.C. communications law firm Irwin, Campbell & Tannenwald, P.C.
- Thomas E Moore, founder and former CEO of Wild Blue
- David Weiss, former Chairman, President and CEO of StorageTek (now part of Sun Microsystems)
- Hari V. Krishnan, CEO, PropertyGuru Group. ex-MD, APAC for LinkedIn (hired as first employee based in Asia).
