= Netta Engelhardt =

Israeli-American mathematical physicist

- נטע אנגלהרדט
- Education: Brandeis University (B.Sc., 2011); University of California, Santa Barbara (Ph.D., 2016)
- Awards: Blavatnik Awards for Young Scientists; New Horizons in Physics Prize; Sloan Research Fellowship; US Department of Energy Early Career Award; Gribov Medal; Presidential Early Career Award for Scientists and Engineers
- Scientific career
- Fields: Physics
- Institutions: MIT
- Doctoral advisor: Gary Horowitz

Netta Engelhardt (Hebrew: נטע אנגלהרדט) is an Israeli-American theoretical physicist known for her work resolving the black hole information paradox, concerning the apparent loss of physical information from objects that enter black holes and become transformed into Hawking radiation. She is an Associate Professor of Physics at the Massachusetts Institute of Technology.

== Education and career ==
Engelhardt was born in Jerusalem and later moved with her family to Boston in 1998. She graduated from Brandeis University in 2011 majoring in both physics and mathematics and completed her Ph.D. in 2016 at the University of California, Santa Barbara advised by Gary Horowitz. After postdoctoral research at Princeton University, she joined MIT in 2019.

== Recognition ==
Engelhardt was a 2019 winner of the Blavatnik Awards for Young Scientists. She was one of the 2021 winners of the New Horizons in Physics Prize, "for calculating the quantum information content of a black hole and its radiation". In 2023 she has been awarded the Gribov Medal of the European Physical Society "for her groundbreaking contributions to the understanding of quantum information in gravity and black hole physics".
