= Stephen Hsu =

American physicist (born 1966)

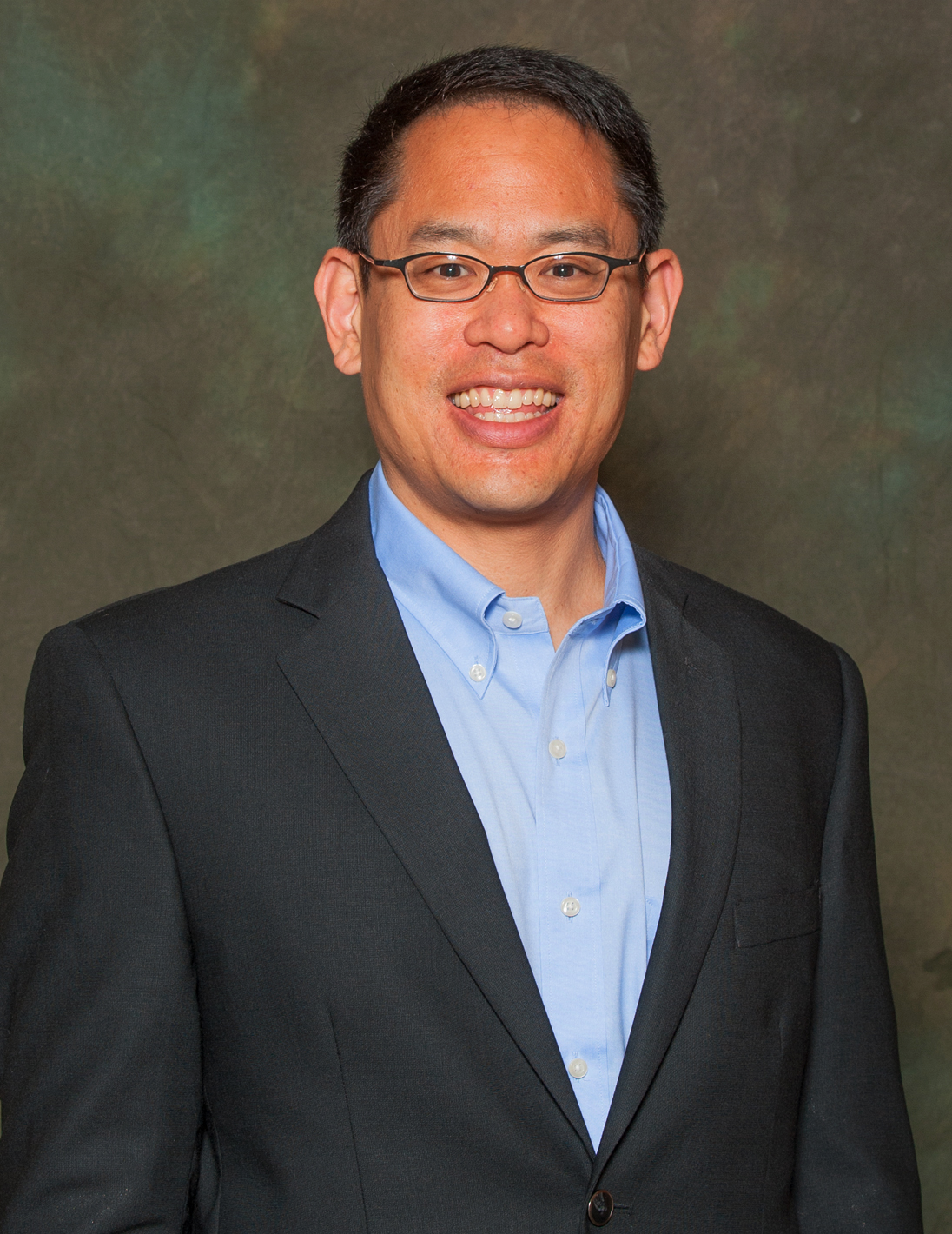
- Hsu in 2015
- Born: Stephen Dao Hui Hsu; 1966 (age 59–60); Ames, Iowa, U.S.
- Education: California Institute of Technology; University of California, Berkeley
- Scientific career
- Fields: Physics
- Workplaces: Harvard University; Yale University; University of Oregon; Michigan State University
- Thesis: Topics in particle physics and cosmology (1991)
- Doctoral advisor: Lawrence John Hall

Stephen Hsu
- Simplified Chinese: 徐道辉
- Traditional Chinese: 徐道輝
- Hanyu Pinyin: Xú Dào Huī

Stephen Dao Hui Hsu (born 1966) is an American physicist, a startup founder, and a former university administrator.

== Early life and education ==
Hsu was born and raised in Ames, Iowa. His father Cheng Ting Hsu (1923–1996), who was born in Wenling, Zhejiang, in what was then the Republic of China, was a professor of aerospace engineering at Iowa State University in Ames from 1958 to 1989. Stephen Hsu's mother was also originally from China, and Hsu had a grandfather who served as a general in the National Revolutionary Army of the Chinese Kuomintang government. At age 12, Hsu took physics and mathematics courses at Iowa State while attending Ames High School.

Hsu received a B.S. from the California Institute of Technology (Caltech) in 1986 at age 19, and a Ph.D. from the University of California, Berkeley in 1991. His doctoral advisor was Lawrence John Hall. After his doctorate, he was a Harvard Junior Fellow and Superconducting Super Collider Fellow from 1991 to 1994.

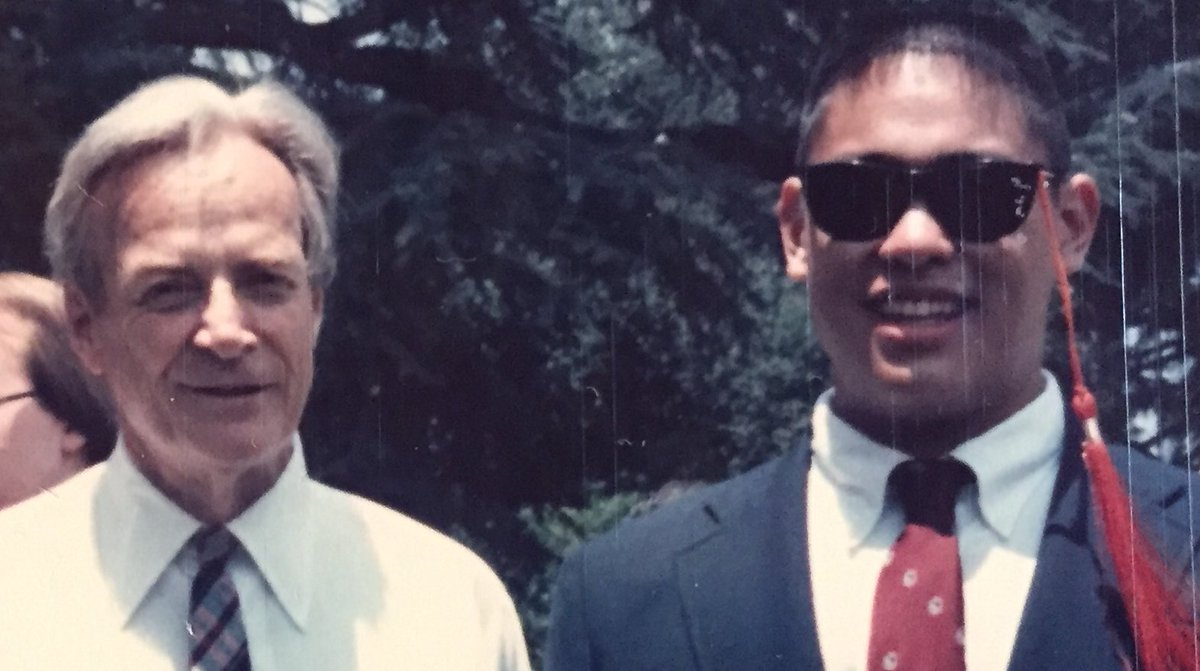
Richard Feynman and Stephen Hsu (age 19). 1986 Caltech graduation.

== Career ==
In 1995, he became an assistant professor at Yale University before moving to the University of Oregon in 1998, where he became a full professor of theoretical physics and director of the Institute of Theoretical Science. Hsu's research has focused on a number of areas in particle physics and cosmology, including phase transitions in the early universe, the ground state of quark matter at high density, black holes and quantum information, minimum length from quantum gravity, dark energy, and quantum foundations.

In July 2012, Michigan State University named him vice president for research and graduate studies. At the time, Inside Higher Ed and Lansing State Journal described the appointment as controversial, due to Hsu's comments endorsing research into using genetic modification to increase human intelligence, and his blog posts describing human race categorization as biologically valid.

On June 10, 2020, the MSU graduate student union began calling for Hsu to be removed from the administrative position. The MSU student association also called for his removal, and multiple petitions were circulated, including a counter-petition. As of June 17, petitions for removal had 700 and 470 signatures, while the counter petition had over 970 signatures. On June 19, 2020 MSU president Samuel L. Stanley announced that Hsu had resigned as vice president, returning to a tenured faculty position. Hsu said that Stanley had requested his resignation, and that he did not agree with Stanley's decision.

== Technology work ==
In 2000, Hsu went on leave from the University of Oregon to create Safeweb, an anonymizer service. In 2003, SafeWeb was acquired by Symantec for its SSL VPN technology.

In 2013, he served as scientific adviser to BGI (formerly Beijing Genomics Institute), and as a member of its Cognitive Genomics Lab.

Hsu is a founder of Genomic Prediction, a company that develops genetic testing for IVF embryos. Hsu has an interest in psychometrics and human genetic variation, which he writes about in his blog and in other publications.

In 2017, Hsu and five collaborators published a paper in Genetics on the use of lasso to construct genomic predictors of complex human traits (height, bone density, cognitive ability), using data from the UK Biobank. Their genotype height predictor estimated adult height within an accuracy of roughly one inch.

In 2018 his research group used the method on the same dataset to build genomic predictors for complex diseases such as hypothyroidism, (resistive) hypertension, type 1 and 2 diabetes, breast cancer, prostate cancer, testicular cancer, gallstones, glaucoma, gout, atrial fibrillation, high cholesterol, asthma, basal cell carcinoma, melanoma, and heart attack. Outliers in risk score (e.g., 99th percentile) were shown, in out-of-sample validation tests, to have up to ten times the risk of ordinary individuals for the specific conditions. The predictors use as input information dozens to thousands of common SNPs measured for each individual.
