= Center for Theoretical Physics =

Center for Theoretical Physics may refer to:

== United States ==
- Berkeley Center for Theoretical Physics, University of California at Berkeley, U.S.
- Maryland Center for Fundamental Physics, College Park, Maryland, U.S.
- MIT Center for Theoretical Physics, Cambridge, Massachusetts, U.S.
- Simons Center for Geometry and Physics, Stony Brook University, New York, U.S.

== Other countries ==
- Center for Mathematics and Theoretical Physics, Rome, Italy
- Indian Institute of Technology Kharagpur, West Bengal, India
- International Centre for Theoretical Physics, Trieste, Italy
- National Center for Theoretical Sciences, Physics, Hsinchu, Taiwan

== See also ==
- Institute for Theoretical Physics (disambiguation)
