= Gribov Medal =

Physics award

The Gribov Medal is administered by the High Energy and Particle Physics Division (EPS-HEPP) of the European Physical Society (EPS).

It is awarded every two years since 2001 for work by an early career researcher (maximum of 8 years - excluding career interruptions - of research experience following the PhD) in Theoretical Particle Physics and/or Field Theory. The prize is awarded during the EPS conference on High Energy Physics, together with the other prizes awarded by EPS-HEPP: the High Energy and Particle Physics Prize, the Cocconi Prize, the Young Experimental Physicist Prize and the Outreach Prize. It is named after Vladimir Naumovich Gribov.

== Recipients ==
Year	Winner	Awarded For	Ref.
2001	Steven Gubser	"For his outstanding work that has revealed a deep connection between gauge theories and gravitational interactions in the framework of string theories. This made it possible to compute and understand interesting properties of a gauge theory in 3+1 dimensions from a gravitational theory in 4+1 dimensions."	
2003	Nima Arkani-Hamed	"For his original approaches to hierarchy problems in the theories of fundamental interactions. In particular for exploring the possibility of large extra dimensions where only gravity can propagate."	
2005	Matias Zaldarriaga	"For his important theoretical contributions to Cosmology, with impact also on the theories of fundamental interactions. Among others for: a) developing an efficient method for calculating the observed CMB fluctuations in a given cosmological model. This has greatly facilitated imposing constraints on cosmological models and is widely used. b) Realizing the importance of polarization in the CMB and the possibility to measure it. c) Pointing out the importance of the effect of gravitational lensing by local matter on the CMB background."	
2007	Niklas Beisert	"For his contributions to the exploration of integrability properties of a four dimensional quantum field theory, N=4 supersymmetric Yang–Mills theory."	
2009	Freddy Cachazo	"For his research with others that led to significant simplifications in the calculation of scattering amplitudes in both gauge theories and gravity ones."	
2011	Davide Gaiotto	"For the uncovering of new facets of the dynamics of four-dimensional supersymmetric gauge theories. In particular, for discovering a large class of four-dimensional superconformal theories and for finding with others important intricate relations between two-dimensional theories of gravity and four-dimensional gauge theories."	
2013	Zohar Komargodski	"For his deep insights into the structure of the renormalization group in four-dimensional field theories and, in particular, his proof (with Adam Schwimmer) of the a-theorem."	
2015	Pedro G. Vieira	"For his groundbreaking contributions to the determination of the exact spectrum of anomalous dimensions of N=4 supersymmetric Yang-Mills theory and scattering amplitudes, for any interaction strength."	
2017	Simon Caron-Huot	"For his groundbreaking contributions to the understanding of the analytic structure of scattering amplitudes and their relation to Wilson loops."	
2019	Douglas Stanford	"For his pioneering work on quantum chaos and its relation to the near-horizon dynamics of black holes."	
2021	Bernhard Mistlberger	"For his groundbreaking contributions to multi-loop computations in QCD and to high-precision predictions of Higgs and vector boson production at hadron colliders."	
2023	Netta Engelhardt	"For her groundbreaking contributions to the understanding of quantum information in gravity and black hole physics."	
2025	Lorenz Eberhardt	"for his groundbreaking contributions to modern string theory, notably for the proof of the conjectured AdS/CFT correspondence in a tractable three-dimensional setting, for offering novel insights into the solution of three-dimensional gravity, and for achieving significant progress in the computation of string amplitudes."	

== See also ==
- List of physics awards
