= Douglas Stanford =

American physicist

- Citizenship: United States
- Education: Stanford University (B.S.) (2005–2009); University of Cambridge (M.S.) (2009–2010); Stanford University (Ph.D.) (2014)
- Awards: Blavatnik Awards for Young Scientists (2017); New Horizons in Physics Prize (2018); Gribov Medal (2019)
- Scientific career
- Fields: Theoretical physics
- Institutions: Institute for Advanced Study; Stanford Institute for Theoretical Physics; Stanford University
- Thesis: Black Holes and the Butterfly Effect (2014)
- Doctoral advisor: Leonard Susskind

Douglas Stanford is an American theoretical physicist. He is an associate professor of physics at Stanford Institute for Theoretical Physics of Stanford University. His research interests include quantum gravity, quantum field theory and string theory. Stanford was awarded the 2018 New Horizons in Physics Prize by Fundamental Physics Prize Foundation for his work on improving the understanding of quantum mechanics of black holes via chaos theory.

== Early life and education ==
Douglas Stanford was born in Anacortes, Washington. He attended Anacortes Senior High school. Stanford graduated from the Stanford University in 2009 with B.S. in physics and mathematics. He earned an M.S. in mathematics from the University of Cambridge in 2010 where he was a Marshall Scholar. He earned his Ph.D. in physics in 2014 from Stanford University, under the guidance of Leonard Susskind.

== Career ==
=== Research ===
Stanford worked at Institute for Advanced Study, Princeton from September 2014 to April 2019 as a post-doctoral researcher. He worked with Juan Maldacena on his and Leonard Susskind's ER-EPR conjecture of the equivalence of wormholes (the ER stands for Einstein-Rosen Bridge) and EPR for quantum entangled particle pairs. The assumption arose as a suggestion to explain the information paradox of black holes, which was heightened by the firewall paradox of Joseph Polchinski. During this time, he worked with Edward Witten on fermionic localization of the Schwarzian theory. In 2019, Stanford joined Stanford University as an assistant professor. As of 2020, he was an associate professor of physics at Stanford Institute for Theoretical Physics.

=== Awards and honours ===
In 2017, Douglas Stanford was awarded the Blavatnik Awards for Young Scientists for his works in quantum gravity and condensed matter physics. In 2018, Stanford was awarded the New Horizons in Physics Prize by Fundamental Physics Prize Foundation for his work on improving the understanding of quantum mechanics of black holes via chaos theory. The prize is worth $100,000. In 2019, Stanford was awarded the Gribov Medal by the European Physical Society for his work on quantum chaos and its relation to the near-horizon dynamics of black holes.

== Selected publications ==
- Shenker, Stephen H.; Stanford, Douglas (2014-03-13). "Black holes and the butterfly effect". Journal of High Energy Physics. 2014 (3): 67. arXiv:1306.0622. Bibcode:2014JHEP...03..067S. doi:10.1007/JHEP03(2014)067. ISSN 1029-8479. S2CID 54184366.
- Stanford, Douglas; Susskind, Leonard (2014-12-11). "Complexity and shock wave geometries". Physical Review D. 90 (12) 126007. arXiv:1406.2678. Bibcode:2014PhRvD..90l6007S. doi:10.1103/PhysRevD.90.126007. S2CID 119207439.
- Maldacena, Juan; Shenker, Stephen H.; Stanford, Douglas (2016-08-17). "A bound on chaos". Journal of High Energy Physics. 2016 (8): 106. arXiv:1503.01409. Bibcode:2016JHEP...08..106M. doi:10.1007/JHEP08(2016)106. ISSN 1029-8479. S2CID 84832638.
- Maldacena, Juan; Stanford, Douglas (2016-11-04). "Remarks on the Sachdev-Ye-Kitaev model". Physical Review D. 94 (10) 106002. arXiv:1604.07818. Bibcode:2016PhRvD..94j6002M. doi:10.1103/PhysRevD.94.106002. S2CID 9216897.
- Stanford, Douglas; Witten, Edward (2017-10-02). "Fermionic localization of the schwarzian theory". Journal of High Energy Physics. 2017 (10): 8. arXiv:1703.04612. Bibcode:2017JHEP...10..008S. doi:10.1007/JHEP10(2017)008. ISSN 1029-8479. S2CID 119353376.
