= Particle Fever =

2013 film by Mark Levinson

- Theatrical release poster
- Directed by: Mark Levinson
- Produced by: David Kaplan; Mark Levinson
- Starring: Savas Dimopoulos; Nima Arkani-Hamed; Fabiola Gianotti; David Kaplan; Monica Dunford; Martin Aleksa; Mike Lamont
- Narrated by: David Kaplan
- Cinematography: Claudia Raschke-Robinson
- Edited by: Walter Murch
- Music by: Robert Miller
- Production company: Anthos Media
- Distributed by: Abramorama; BOND360
- Release dates: July 14, 2013 (Sheffield, UK); March 5, 2014 (United States)
- Running time: 99 minutes
- Country: United States
- Language: English
- Budget: $1.4 million
- Box office: $869,838

Particle Fever is a 2013 American documentary film tracking the first round of experiments at the Large Hadron Collider (LHC) near Geneva, Switzerland. The film follows the experimental physicists at the European Organization for Nuclear Research (CERN) who run the experiments, as well as the theoretical physicists who attempt to provide a conceptual framework for the LHC's results. The film begins in 2008 with the first firing of the LHC and concludes in 2012 with the successful identification of the Higgs boson.

The Communication Awards of the National Academies of Sciences, Engineering, and Medicine awarded a $20,000 prize for excellence in communicating science to the general public in Film/Radio/TV to David Kaplan and Mark Levinson for "Particle Fever" on October 14, 2015. The awards are given to individuals in four categories: books, film/radio/TV, magazine/newspaper and online, and are supported by the W. M. Keck Foundation.

== Synopsis ==
The film is composed of two narrative threads. One follows the large team of experimental physicists at CERN as they try to get the LHC running properly. After a promising initial test run, the LHC suffers a liquid helium leak in 2007 that damages its electromagnets. Fabiola Gianotti, Martin Aleksa, and Monica Dunford are all shown discussing how to handle the negative publicity surrounding the accident, and how to proceed. After repairs in 2009, the LHC begins to run experiments again at half power.

The other thread follows the competing theories of Nima Arkani-Hamed and his mentor Savas Dimopoulos. In the film, Arkani-Hamed advocates for the "multiverse" theory, which predicts the mass of the Higgs boson to be approximately 140 giga-electronvolts. Dimopoulos argues for the more-established supersymmetry theory, which predicts the mass of the Higgs boson to be approximately 115 GeV.

The narrative threads combine at the end of the film, when CERN announces the confirmed existence of a Higgs-like particle, with a mass of approximately 125 GeV. The discovery of the particle is met with a standing ovation, and Peter Higgs is shown wiping away tears. However, neither of the competing theories of the universe is definitively supported by the finding.

Later, Kaplan is shown admitting that none of his theoretical models are supported by this finding, and that the long-term implications of the discovery are unclear.

== Production ==
The film was shot over a period of seven years. It was directed by Mark Levinson, a former theoretical physicist with a doctorate from UC-Berkeley. Levinson produced the film along with David Kaplan, a professor of physics at Johns Hopkins University and producers Andrea Miller, Carla Solomon and Wendy Sax. The team gathered nearly 500 hours of footage from both professional camera crews and amateur video self-recordings shot by the physicists themselves. This footage was then edited by Walter Murch, who had previously won Academy Awards for his work on Apocalypse Now and The English Patient. Kaplan worked closely with MK12 to create the animated sequences which are used throughout the film.

The film premiered at Sheffield Doc/Fest on July 14, 2013.

== Release ==
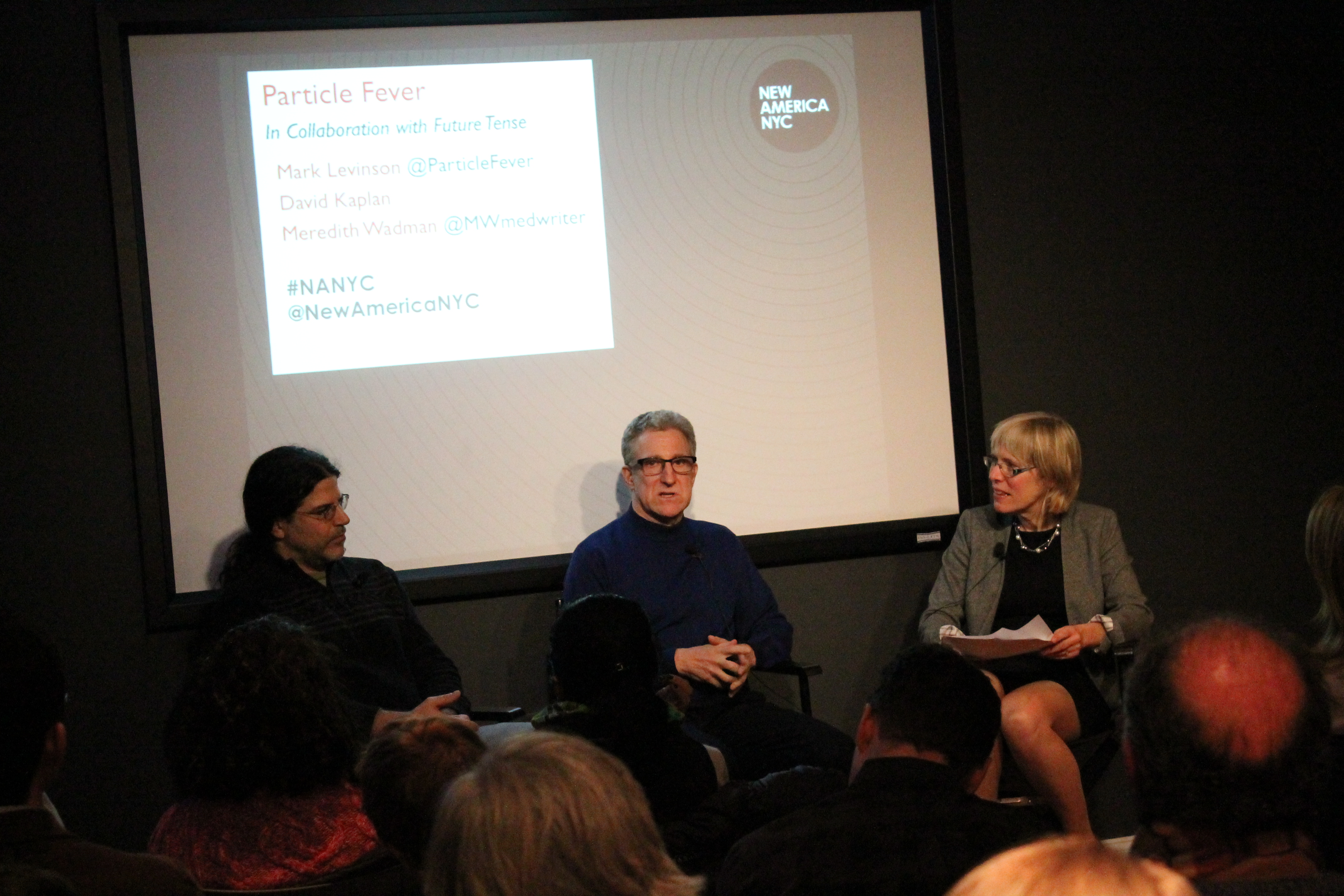
David Kaplan, Mark Levinson, and Meredith Wadman discuss the film in New York City in January 2014.

Particle Fever was shown at several festivals before opening in limited release in the United States on March 5, 2014.

=== Critical response ===
The film received critical acclaim, with reviewers praising the film for making theoretical arguments seem comprehensible, for making scientific experiments seem thrilling, for making particle physicists seem human, and for promoting physics outreach. Several reviewers singled out Murch's editing for praise. On his blog, theoretical physicist and string theory critic Peter Woit called the film "fantastically good", but cautioned that Arkani-Hamed's linking of the Higgs boson to multiverse theory was a tenuous proposition, as this theory did not currently make testable predictions.

On Rotten Tomatoes the film has an approval rating of 96% based on 48 reviews, with an average rating of 7.92 out of 10. The site's consensus states: "The concepts behind its heady subject matter may fly over the heads of most viewers, but Particle Fever presents it in such a way that even the least science-inclined viewers will find themselves enraptured." On Metacritic, the film has an 87 out of 100 rating, based on 18 critics, indicating "universal acclaim".

== Awards ==
In 2016, it was one of the inaugural winners of the Stephen Hawking Medal for Science Communication.

== Related media ==
On July 27, 2024, at San Diego Comic-Con, composer Bear McCreary announced that he is working on a musical theater version of the documentary film, called Particle Fever: The Musical. He also announced that he's working with composer/lyricist Zoe Sarnak, playwrighter David Henry Hwang, and art director Leigh Silverman.
