= Shamit Kachru =

American theoretical physicist and professor (born 1970)

- Born: July 13, 1970 (age 56); Champaign, Illinois, US
- Education: Harvard University; Princeton University
- Known for: Work on string duality and AdS/CFT correspondence Inflation (cosmology) and String theory landscape Physical mathematics
- Spouse: Eva Silverstein
- Parents: Braj Kachru (father); Yamuna Kachru (mother)
- Awards: Department of Energy Outstanding Junior Investigator Award, Alfred P. Sloan Foundation Fellowship, David and Lucile Packard Foundation Fellowship, Bergmann Memorial Award, Simons Investigator Award, American Academy of Arts and Sciences
- Scientific career
- Fields: Physicist
- Workplaces: Stanford University
- Doctoral advisor: Edward Witten

Shamit Kachru (born 1970) is an American theoretical physicist, a professor emeritus of physics at Stanford University, and a former Wells Family Director of the Stanford Institute for Theoretical Physics. He served as the Stanford Physics Department Chair from 2018 to 2021. He retired in 2023.

== Career ==
Kachru's research has explored a broad range of topics in string theory and quantum field theory, and their applications in cosmology, condensed matter physics, and elementary particle theory. He has made central contributions to the study of compactifications of string theory from ten to four dimensions, especially in the investigation of mechanisms which could yield string models of dark energy or cosmic inflation. He has also made notable contributions to the discovery and exploration of string dualities, to the study of models of supersymmetry breaking in string theory, and to the construction of calculable dual descriptions of strongly coupled particle physics and condensed matter systems. More recently, his work has focused on connections between geometry, number theory, and string theory. His research has also moved into theoretical questions in evolutionary biology and ecology.

Kachru is a recipient of a Department of Energy Outstanding Junior Investigator Award, an Alfred P. Sloan Foundation Fellowship, the Bergmann Memorial Award, a David and Lucile Packard Foundation Fellowship, and a Simons Investigator Award. He was elected as a Member of the American Academy of Arts and Sciences in 2022.

In 1986, Kachru attended the prestigious Research Science Institute. He graduated from University High School in Urbana, Illinois and from Harvard University before obtaining a doctorate in physics from Princeton University under the supervision of Edward Witten. Kachru was a junior fellow in the Harvard Society of Fellows. In 2017 he received a Simons Investigator Award.

Kachru is best known for his extensive research on flux compactifications (including work with Steve Giddings and Joseph Polchinski), which can stabilize the extra dimensions of string theory. In collaboration with Renata Kallosh, Andrei Linde, and Sandip Trivedi, he found the first models of accelerated expansion of the universe in low energy supersymmetric string compactifications (see KKLT mechanism). He made notable contributions to string theory duality (with Cumrun Vafa), the AdS/CFT correspondence (with Eva Silverstein), and to the construction of models of cosmic inflation. He has also done significant work on the holographic description of finite density quantum matter, the theory of non-Fermi liquids, and the understanding of moonshine and its connections to physics and geometry.

As of September 2023, Kachru is working with PDT Partners, and according to his website his "current scientific research is focused on understanding dynamics of various liquid global financial markets".

He was one of the signatories of Statement on AI Risk (2023) open letter.

He is the son of Braj Kachru and Yamuna Kachru, and is married to fellow Stanford professor Eva Silverstein.
