= Natalia Toro =

American particle physicist

- Born: c. 1985 (age 40–41)
- Education: Massachusetts Institute of Technology; Harvard University
- Known for: dark matter, particle physics
- Spouse: Philip Schuster
- Scientific career
- Fields: Physics
- Workplaces: Perimeter Institute for Theoretical Physics
- Thesis: Fundamental Physics at the Threshold of Discovery (2007)
- Doctoral advisor: Nima Arkani-Hamed
- Website: Perimeter Institute page

Natalia Toro (born c. 1985) is an American particle physicist known for her work in the study of dark matter. Based at the Perimeter Institute for Theoretical Physics in Waterloo, Ontario, Toro was the youngest winner of the Intel Science Talent Search and was awarded the 2015 New Horizons in Physics Prize.

== Early life and education ==
Toro is the daughter of Dr. Gabriel and Beatriz Toro. She began taking college level classes in sixth grade and was a member of the United States Physics Olympiad Team in 1998. At the age of 14 she won the 1999 Intel Science Talent Search, the youngest winner in the history of the prize. At the time, Toro was a senior at Fairview High School in Boulder, Colorado, having skipped fifth, seventh and eighth grade. She won the prize in recognition of research regarding the oscillations of neutrinos and their impact on high-energy physics undertaken at the Research Science Institute of the Massachusetts Institute of Technology, where Edmund Bertschinger served as her mentor.

Toro completed a PhD at Harvard University in 2007 under the supervision of Nima Arkani-Hamed. Her thesis was titled: Fundamental Physics at the Threshold of Discovery. Following the completion of her PhD, Toro worked as a research associate at the SLAC National Accelerator Laboratory. Between 2007–2010, she pursued postdoctoral studies in the Department of Physics at Stanford University.

== Career ==
Toro joined the Perimeter Institute for Theoretical Physics in Waterloo, Ontario in 2010 as a junior faculty member in the Particle Physics program. She frequently collaborates with husband Philip Schuster on research regarding the nature of dark matter. Together they have developed a research framework as part of the Heavy Photon Search, contributed to the Beam Dump Experiment and served as co-leads of A Prime Experiment at the Thomas Jefferson National Accelerator Facility in Virginia.

In 2015 Toro and Schuster won the New Horizons in Physics Prize for their work advancing new approaches for searches at the Large Hadron Collider and experimental searches for dark matter.

== Awards ==
- 1999 - Intel Science Talent Search
- 2014 - New Horizons in Physics Prize
- 2021 - Ernest Orlando Lawrence Award
