= Lance J. Dixon =

American physicist (born 1961)

Lance Jenkins Dixon (born 22 June 1961, in Pasadena, California) is an American theoretical particle physicist. He is a professor in the SLAC Theory Group at the Stanford Linear Accelerator Center (SLAC) at Stanford University.

Dixon received in 1982 his B.S. in physics and applied mathematics from Caltech and received in 1986 his doctorate from Princeton University. As a postdoc he was at SLAC. From 1987 he was assistant professor at Princeton University, from 1989 he was a Panofsky Fellow at the SLAC and in 1992 he became an associate professor and in 1998 a full professor at SLAC.

He has been a visiting professor at the École normale supérieure and the University of Cambridge (Clare Hall).

In 1987, Dixon gave a talk at the International Centre for Theoretical Physics in Trieste where he described a symmetry of supersymmetric string theories that would become known as mirror symmetry.

Starting in the 1990s Dixon developed, with Zvi Bern and others, new methods (generalized unitarity methods among others) for the calculation of Feynman diagrams in quantum chromodynamics (QCD) and other Yang–Mills theories. These new methods became more relevant with the requirements of the Large Hadron Collider calculations in the 2000s and also provided new insights into the divergences in the supergravity perturbation series.

In 2014, with Zvi Bern and David Kosower, Dixon received the Sakurai Prize for "pathbreaking contributions to the calculation of perturbative scattering amplitudes, which led to a deeper understanding of quantum field theory and to powerful new tools for computing QCD processes."

His 1991 publication with Vadim S. Kaplunovsky and Jan Louis has over 800 citations. In 1995 Dixon was elected a Fellow of the American Physical Society.

He was elected a member of the National Academy of Sciences in 2022.

== Selected publications ==
- Dixon "Calculating scattering amplitudes efficiently", TASI Lectures 1996
- Dixon "UV Behavior of N = 8 Supergravity", Erice School 2009
- Bern, Dixon, Kosower "Quantum Gravity Particles may resemble ordinary particles of force2", Scientific American, May 2012
- Bern, Dixon, Kosower "On-shell methods in perturbative QCD", Annals of Physics, 322, 2007, 1587–1634
- Bern, Dixon, Kosower "Progress in 1 loop QCD calculations", Annual Review Nuclear Particle Physics, 46, 1996, 109–148

== Awards, honors ==
- Fellow, American Physical Society, 1995
- Fellow, National Academy of Sciences, 2022
- Galileo Galilei Medal, 2023
