= Institute for Theoretical Physics =

Institute for Theoretical Physics or Institute of Theoretical Physics may refer to:

== China ==
- Institute of Theoretical Physics, The Chinese University of Hong Kong
- Kavli Institute for Theoretical Physics China, at the Chinese Academy of Sciences, Beijing
- Zhejiang Institute of Modern Physics, Zhejiang University, Hangzhou, China

== United States ==
- Bhaumik Institute for Theoretical Physics, University of California, Los Angeles, U.S.
- C. N. Yang Institute for Theoretical Physics, Stony Brook University, New York, U.S.
- Kavli Institute for Theoretical Physics, University of California, Santa Barbara, U.S.
- Stanford Institute for Theoretical Physics, Stanford University, California, U.S.
- Walter Burke Institute for Theoretical Physics, California Institute of Technology, U.S.
- William I. Fine Theoretical Physics Institute, University of Minnesota, U.S.

== Other countries ==
- Bogolyubov Institute for Theoretical Physics, National Academy of Sciences of Ukraine, Kiev, Ukraine
- Galileo Galilei Institute for Theoretical Physics, Florence, Italy
- Institute for Theoretical Physics, Copenhagen, Denmark
- Institute for Theoretical Physics, Utrecht University, The Netherlands
- Landau Institute for Theoretical Physics, Moscow, Russia
- Lorentz Institute for theoretical physics, Leiden University, The Netherlands
- Nordic Institute for Theoretical Physics, Stockholm, Sweden
- Perimeter Institute for Theoretical Physics, Waterloo, Ontario, Canada
- Yukawa Institute for Theoretical Physics, Kyoto University, Japan
- Institute of Theoretical Physics of the São Paulo State University (IFT-UNESP), São Paulo, Brazil

== See also ==
- Center for Theoretical Physics (disambiguation)
- Institute of Physics (disambiguation)
- ITP (disambiguation)
