= Pakistan Institute of Physics =

Pakistani research institute

Pakistan Institute of Physics (PIP)
- Established: June 1976
- Location: Lahore, Punjab, Pakistan
- University Campus: University of Engineering and Technology, Lahore
- President: Prof. Muhammad Zakria Butt, D.Sc.
- Memberships: +942
- Colors: Blue and White
- Type: Research and Education

Pakistan Institute of Physics (PIP) of the University of Engineering and Technology, Lahore is a national research institute in Pakistan. It is a scientific charity devoted to increase the practice and understanding of physics.

It is the main and the professional body for the physicists in Pakistan and grant research licenses to the physicists to carry out their professional research in the different institutes of Pakistan. Its functions are to regulate physical research in the institution.

The PIP was established in 1976 by the eminent physicists of Pakistan after the successful establishment of International Nathiagali Summer College on Physics and Contemporary Needs (INSC). The main objective of PIP is to promote the advancement and dissemination of the knowledge of physics, pure and applied and the elevation of the profession of physics. In this way PIP is playing its role for the improvement of physics education and research in Pakistan.

== Academic research ==
Each year, PIP carried out both national and international conferences. The Institute of Physics (PIP) promotes research to the fields of Nano Science and Technology, Laser-Material Interactions, Plasma Physics, materials Science, Quantum Well Devices and Super Conductivity, photovoltaic, Atomic and Nuclear Physics, Medical and Health Physics, Atmospheric Physics, Meteorology and Environmental Physics.
