= David E. Kaplan (physicist) =

American physicist and television host

- Born: United States
- Education: UC Berkeley; University of Washington
- Awards: Kavli Frontiers Fellow; Alfred P. Sloan Fellow
- Scientific career
- Fields: Theoretical particle physics
- Workplaces: Johns Hopkins University
- Doctoral advisor: Ann Nelson

David Elazzar Kaplan is a theoretical particle physicist at the Johns Hopkins University.

Kaplan received his Bachelor of Science from the University of California at Berkeley in 1991, his master's in physics from the University of Washington in 1996 and PhD from the same institute under supervision of Ann Nelson in 1999. After postdoctoral positions at the University of Chicago, Argonne National Lab and in the SLAC Theory Group, he joined the faculty at Johns Hopkins in 2002.

His primary research interest is physics beyond the standard model, with a particular focus on the Higgs mechanism and potentially related physics such as supersymmetry, new forces, extra dimensions, and dark matter. He is also exploring connections between high energy physics and cosmology. He was selected as a Kavli Frontiers Fellow of the National Academy of Sciences, and an Alfred P. Sloan Fellow.

In 2011, Kaplan co-hosted season three of National Geographic Channel's Known Universe documentary series along with Sigrid Close, Andy Howell, Michael J. Massimino, and Steve Jacobs. Kaplan also produced (and starred in) the documentary Particle Fever.

== Honors and awards ==
- 2018 Andrew Gemant Award of the American Institute of Physics
