= Supersymmetric Yang–Mills theory =

Supersymmetric Yang–Mills may refer to

- N = 1 supersymmetric Yang–Mills theory
- Seiberg–Witten theory, corresponding to the low-energy action of N = 2 supersymmetric Yang–Mills theory
- N = 4 supersymmetric Yang–Mills theory
