= Pedro Vieira =

Portuguese theoretical physicist

- Born: 1982 (age 43–44)
- Citizenship: Portugal
- Awards: Sloan Fellowship (2015); Gribov Medal (2015); Sackler Prize (2018); New Horizons in Physics Prize (2020)
- Scientific career
- Fields: Mathematical physics Quantum field theory
- Institutions: Perimeter Institute; ICTP-SAIFR
- Thesis: Integrability in AdS/CFT – Bethe ansatz and String quantization beyond infinite volume (2008)
- Website: Perimeter Institute – Pedro Vieira

Pedro Gil Vieira is a Portuguese theoretical physicist who has done significant work in the area of quantum field theory and quantum gravity. One of his most important contributions is the exact solution for the spectrum of a four-dimensional quantum field theory, finite coupling proposal for polygonal Wilson loops and three point functions in N=4 Super Yang-Mills.

== Awards ==
Pedro Vieira has received these awards:

- 2015 – Alfred P. Sloan Foundation Fellowship
- 2015 – Gribov Medal
- 2018 – Raymond and Beverly Sackler International Prize in Physics
- 2020 – New Horizons in Physics Prize, Breakthrough Prize Foundation
