= Eva Silverstein =

American string theory and cosmologist

- Born: October 24, 1970 (age 55); Spokane, Washington, U.S.
- Education: Harvard University, (A.B., 1992); Princeton University, (Ph.D., 1996)
- Spouse: Shamit Kachru
- Awards: MacArthur Fellowship 1999; Sloan Fellowship 1999; Simons Investigator 2017
- Scientific career
- Fields: String theory Cosmology
- Institutions: Rutgers University; Kavli Institute for Theoretical Physics; Stanford University
- Doctoral advisor: Edward Witten

Eva Silverstein (born October 24, 1970) is an American theoretical physicist, cosmologist, and string theorist. She is a professor of physics at Stanford University and director of the Modern Inflationary Cosmology collaboration within the Simons Foundation Origins of the Universe initiative.

== Life, education, and work ==
Raised in Spokane, Washington, Silverstein is the daughter of Harry S. and Lorinda Knight Silverstein and graduated from Lewis and Clark High School. Her father is a professor emeritus of philosophy at Washington State University in Pullman. Silverstein earned her bachelor's degree in physics from Harvard University in 1992 and her doctoral degree from Princeton University four years later.

Silverstein's primary research areas include cosmic inflation, namely the creation of predictive and testable new mechanisms which have enabled systematic understanding of the process and the role of ultraviolet-sensitive qualities in observational cosmology (including string-theoretic versions of large field inflation and novel mechanisms involving inflation interactions); implications of long-range interactions in string theory for black hole physics; and mechanism development for breaking super-symmetry and stabilizing the extra dimensions of string theory. In her work on early-universe cosmology, she makes extensive contributions to string theory and gravitational physics. Her early work included control of tachyon condensation in string theory and resulting resolution of some spacetime singularities (with Joseph Polchinski and others). Other significant research contributions include the construction of the first models of dark energy in string theory, called axion monodromy, the first UV complete model of large-field inflation. She also contributed to discovering some basic extensions of the AdS/CFT correspondence to more realistic field theories (with Shamit Kachru), as well as the discovery of a predictive new mechanism for cosmic inflation involving D-brane dynamics (with David Tong) which helped motivate more systematic analyses of primordial non-Gaussianity.

Silverstein is married to fellow string theorist Shamit Kachru; both were doctoral students of Edward Witten.

== Academic appointments ==
- Postdoctoral associate, Rutgers University, 1996–1997
- Assistant professor, SLAC, Stanford, 1997–2001
- Associate professor, SLAC and Stanford Physics Department, Stanford, 2001–2006
- Professor, SLAC and Stanford Physics Department, Stanford, 2006–2016
- Professor, Stanford Physics Department, Stanford, 2006–Present
- Professor, University of California Physics Department

== Awards and honors ==
- MacArthur Fellow, 1999
- DOE Outstanding Junior Investigator, 1999–2001
- Sloan Fellowship, 1999–2003
- Bergmann Memorial Award, 2000
- APS Fellow, 2016 "For fundamental contributions to quantum gravity and early universe cosmology."
- Simons Investigator, 2017
- American Academy of Arts and Sciences (AAAS) Elected Fellow, 2020
