= Nima Arkani-Hamed =

American-Canadian physicist (born 1972)

- نیما ارکانی حامد
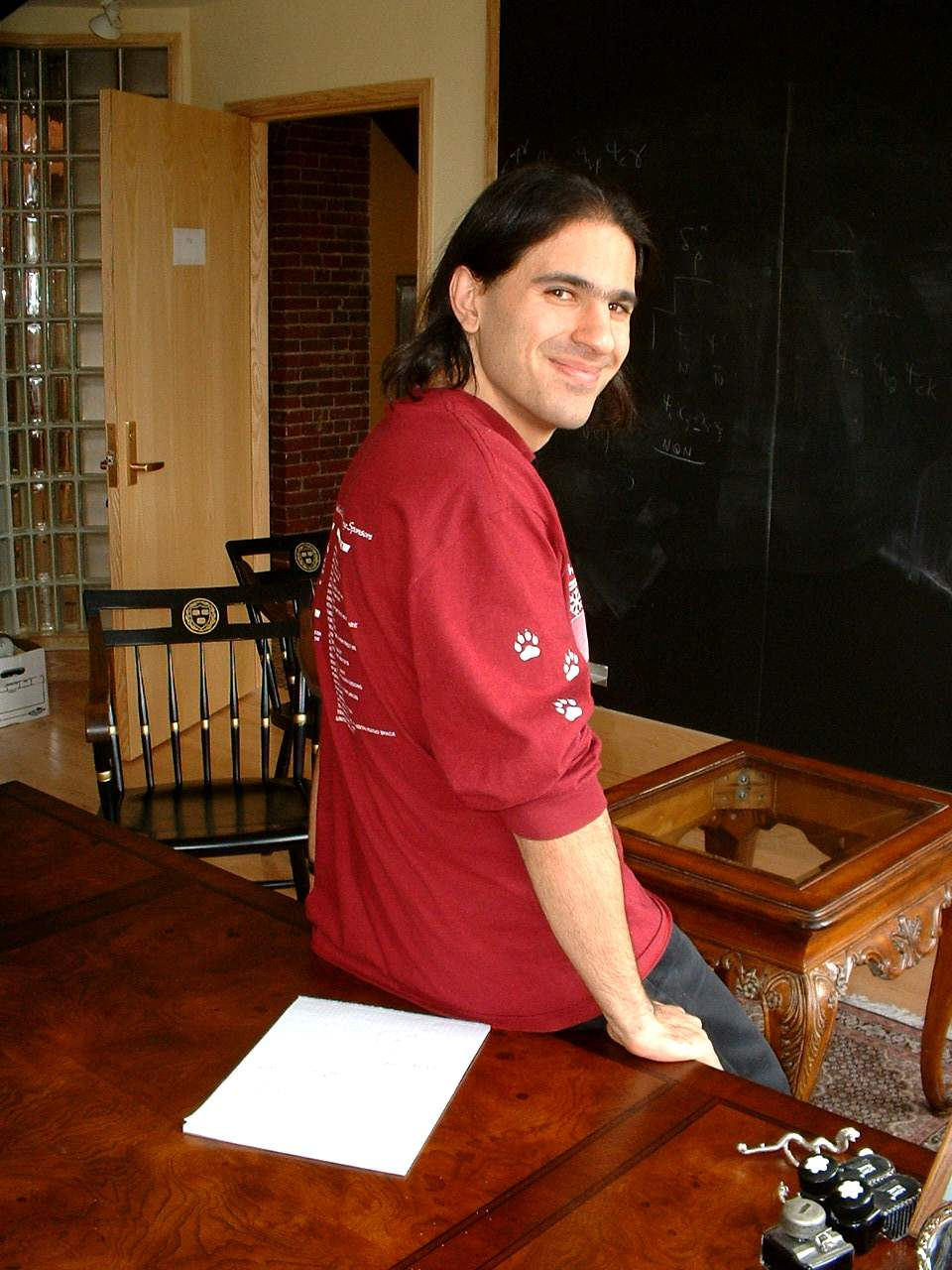
- Arkani-Hamed in 2004
- Born: April 5, 1972 (age 54); Houston, Texas, U.S.
- Education: University of Toronto (HBSc); University of California, Berkeley (PhD)
- Known for: Large extra dimensions; Dimensional deconstruction; Little Higgs; Split supersymmetry; Weak gravity conjecture; Dark matter; Scattering amplitudes; Amplituhedron; Future Circular Collider
- Awards: Gribov Medal (2003); Sackler Prize in the Physical Sciences (2008); Breakthrough Prize in Fundamental Physics (2012); Sakurai Prize (2021)
- Scientific career
- Fields: Physics
- Workplaces: Institute for Advanced Study; Harvard University; Cornell University
- Thesis: Supersymmetry and hierarchies (1997)
- Doctoral advisor: Lawrence John Hall
- Doctoral students: Jared Kaplan; Philip Schuster; Leonardo Senatore; Jesse Thaler; Natalia Toro
- Website: www.sns.ias.edu/~arkani/

Nima Arkani-Hamed (Persian: نیما ارکانی حامد; born April 5, 1972) is an Iranian-American-Canadian theoretical physicist, with interests in high-energy physics, quantum field theory, string theory, cosmology and collider physics. Arkani-Hamed is a member of the permanent faculty at the Institute for Advanced Study in Princeton, New Jersey, where he is also director of the Carl P. Feinberg Cross-Disciplinary Program in Innovation. He is also director of The Center for Future High Energy Physics (CFHEP) in Beijing, China.

== Early life ==
Nima Arkani-Hamed was born on April 5, 1972, in Houston, Texas, to Jafargholi "Jafar" Arkani-Hamed and Hamideh Alasti, both physicists from Iran. His father, a native of Tabriz, worked for the NASA Apollo program in the 1970s, and later taught earth and planetary sciences at McGill University in Montreal.

Arkani-Hamed spent his early childhood in the United States. In 1979, following the Iranian Revolution, he and his family returned to Iran after the new government claimed that greater freedom of expression and new opportunities would be available. However, the start of the Islamic Cultural Revolution in 1980 led to the forceful closures of universities across Iran. Arkani-Hamed's father, Jafar, who at the time was chairman of the physics department at Sharif University of Technology in Tehran, wrote a petition with faculty, denouncing the closures. Arkani-Hamed's father and his colleagues were subsequently marked for arrest by the Islamic regime officials. As a result, the family went underground and spent their life savings to flee to Canada.

== Academic career ==
Arkani-Hamed graduated from the University of Toronto with a joint honours degree in mathematics and physics in 1993. He then pursued graduate studies at the University of California, Berkeley, where he worked under the supervision of Lawrence Hall. Most of Arkani-Hamed's graduate work focused on supersymmetry and flavor physics; his doctoral dissertation, titled Supersymmetry and Hierarchies, was completed in 1997. He subsequently conducted postdoctoral research in the SLAC Theory Group at Stanford University, where he collaborated with Savas Dimopoulos and Giorgi Dvali on the development of the paradigm of large extra dimensions.

In 1999, Arkani-Hamed joined the faculty of the University of California, Berkeley Department of Physics. In January 2001, he took a leave of absence from Berkeley to visit Harvard University and later remained there as a professor from 2002 to 2008. In 2008, he joined the School of Natural Sciences at the Institute for Advanced Study in Princeton, New Jersey, as a professor, and in 2021 he became the inaugural Carl P. Feinberg Director of the Cross-Disciplinary Program there.

Since 2013, Arkani-Hamed has been a leading figure in research on the amplituhedron, a geometric structure that simplifies calculations of particle interactions in certain quantum field theories.

== Honors and awards ==
In 2003, Arkani-Hamed won the Gribov Medal of the European Physical Society, and in the summer of 2005 while at Harvard he won the Phi Beta Kappa chapter's award for teaching excellence. In 2008, he won the Raymond and Beverly Sackler Prize given at Tel Aviv University to young scientists who have made outstanding and fundamental contributions in Physical Science. He was elected to the American Academy of Arts and Sciences in 2009. He gave the Messenger lectures at Cornell University in 2010, and was an A. D. White Professor-at-Large at Cornell University from 2013 to 2019. In 2012 he was an inaugural awardee of the Breakthrough Prize in Fundamental Physics, the creation of physicist and internet entrepreneur, Yuri Milner. He was one of six physicists featured in the award-winning 2013 documentary film Particle Fever, and was elected to the National Academy of Sciences in 2017. In 2021, he was awarded the Sakurai Prize of the American Physical Society.

== Personal views ==
Nima identifies himself as an atheist. On 21 April 2016, he gave a public talk titled, The Morality of Fundamental Physics at Cornell University and said:

...part of my motivation for giving this talk is that like many physicists, many scientists, I'm an atheist. But unlike some atheists, I'm certainly not a militant atheist. And I dislike a lot a certain strand of militant atheism.... I don't believe in God. I do, however, think that instead of worshiping a vast and unknowable God, we can devote ourselves to this slow unveiling of the vastness of truth in all of its glory....

== See also ==
- List of theoretical physicists
