= Philip Schuster (physicist) =

Theoretical physicist

- Education: MIT (SB); Harvard (MS, PhD)
- Spouse: Natalia Toro
- Scientific career
- Fields: Particle physics Theoretical physics
- Workplaces: SLAC; Perimeter Institute
- Doctoral advisor: Nima Arkani-Hamed

Philip C. Schuster is a theoretical elementary particle physicist and chair of the Particle Physics and Astrophysics Department at SLAC National Accelerator Laboratory.

== Biography ==
Schuster "knew from a young age he wanted to go into particle physics." He earned his bachelor's degree in physics from MIT in 2003 followed by master's and doctoral degrees from Harvard, with his thesis Uncovering the New Standard Model at the LHC advised by Nima Arkani-Hamed. He held positions at SLAC and the Institute for Advanced Study, as well as a junior faculty position at the Perimeter Institute for Theoretical Physics, before returning to SLAC as associate professor in 2015.

He is known for his research on physics beyond the standard model and in particular theoretical contributions to the search for dark matter. His work has dovetailed closely with experiment, including the Heavy Photon Search, the APEX experiment at Jefferson Lab, and the Light Dark Matter Experiment (LDMX).

Schuster won the New Horizons in Physics Prize in 2015 "For pioneering the 'simplified models' framework for new physics searches at the Large Hadron Collider, as well as spearheading new experimental searches for dark sectors using high-intensity electron beams."
