= Alejandro Jenkins =

Costa Rican physicist

- Born: Alejandro Jenkins Villalobos; 17 October 1979; San José, Costa Rica
- Education: California Institute of Technology, Harvard University, University of Costa Rica
- Scientific career
- Fields: Theoretical physics
- Workplaces: University of Costa Rica, Florida State University, Massachusetts Institute of Technology, California Institute of Technology
- Thesis: Topics in particle physics and cosmology beyond the standard model (2006)
- Doctoral advisor: Mark B. Wise

Alejandro Jenkins (born 17 October 1979, in San José, Costa Rica) is a Costa Rican theoretical physicist. He is currently a professor at the University of Costa Rica and a member of Costa Rica's National Academy of Sciences. He has worked on applications of quantum field theory to particle physics and cosmology, as well as on self-oscillating dynamical systems and quantum thermodynamics.

== Education and employment ==
Jenkins entered the University of Costa Rica in 1997, studying mathematics. He later attended Harvard College, where he resided in Currier House. In 2001 he graduated from Harvard with an A.B. degree in physics and mathematics. He received his Ph.D. in theoretical physics at Caltech in 2006, working with Mark Wise on "Topics in particle physics and cosmology beyond the Standard Model". Some of the work in Jenkins's doctoral dissertation concerned models of dark energy in cosmology.

Jenkins was a postdoctoral researcher at Caltech (2006), at the MIT Center for Theoretical Physics (2006-09), and at Florida State University's high-energy physics group (2009–12). He became a professor of physics at the University of Costa Rica in 2013 and was elected as a member of Costa Rica's National Academy of Sciences in 2015.

== Research ==
=== Quark mass and congeniality to life ===
==== The anthropic principle ====
In physics and cosmology, the anthropic principle is the collective name for several ways of asserting that the observations of the physical Universe must be compatible with the life observed in it. The principle was formulated as a response to a series of observations that the laws of nature and its fundamental physical constants remarkably take on values that are consistent with conditions for life as we know it rather than a set of values that would not be consistent with life as observed on Earth. The anthropic principle states that this apparent coincidence is actually a necessity because living observers would not be able to exist, and hence, observe the universe, were these laws and constants not constituted in this way.

==== Jenkins's contributions ====
To test this hypothesis, Robert Jaffe, Jenkins, and Itamar Kimchi used models to "tweak" the values of the quark masses and examined how that would affect the ability of stable isotopes of carbon and hydrogen to form, making organic chemistry possible. They found that, within the various potential universes they examined, many had very different qualities from our own, but that nonetheless life could still develop. In some cases, where forms of carbon we find in our universe were unstable, other forms of stable carbon were identified as possible.

The work by Jaffe, Jenkins, and Kimchi on anthropic constraints on quark masses was highlighted by the American Physical Society's Physics magazine. That work, along with research by other theorists on the possibility of an anthropically-allowed "weakless universe", was summarized in Scientific American magazine's January 2010 cover story, which Jenkins co-authored with Israeli particle physicist Gilad Perez. Jenkins also explained his work in a 2015 appearance on the TV show Through the Wormhole.

=== Self-oscillation and thermodynamics ===
Jenkins's review of the physics of self-oscillators was published by Physics Reports in 2013. Jenkins has also collaborated with mathematical physicist Robert Alicki and theoretical chemist David Gelbwaser-Klimovsky on applying related ideas in order to arrive at a better understanding of non-equilibrium thermodynamics and quantum thermodynamics, with a particular application to the microscopic physics of solar cells and the triboelectric effect. With experimentalist Elizabeth von Hauff they have also presented a new model of the pumping of electrical charge in batteries. With Michał Horodecki and others, he was proposed a description of the Josephson junction as an open system (a quantum engine).

== See also ==
- Quantum thermodynamics
- Inflation (cosmology)
- Quark
- Anthropic principle
- Multiverse
- Feynman sprinkler
- Many-worlds interpretation
