= Jeffrey Goldstone =

British theoretical physicist (1933–2026)

- Born: 3 September 1933; Manchester, England
- Died: 12 October 2026 (aged 93)
- Education: Trinity College, Cambridge
- Known for: Goldstone boson Linked-cluster theorem Quantum approximate optimization algorithm
- Awards: Dannie Heineman Prize (1981); Guthrie Medal (1983); Dirac Medal (ICTP) (1991)
- Scientific career
- Fields: Quantum mechanics
- Workplaces: MIT; Cambridge
- Doctoral advisor: Hans Bethe

Jeffrey Goldstone (3 September 1933 – 12 October 2026) was a British theoretical physicist and academic who was an emeritus physics faculty member at the MIT Center for Theoretical Physics. Goldstone worked at the University of Cambridge until 1977.

He is noted for his work on the mathematical formalism of quantum field theory and his contributions to quantum optimization algorithms. The Goldstone boson and the related Goldstone theorem are named after him.

== Life and career ==
Born in Manchester, England, on 3 September 1933, Goldstone was educated at Manchester Grammar School and Trinity College, Cambridge (B.A. 1954, Ph.D. 1958). He worked on the theory of nuclear matter under the guidance of Hans Bethe and developed modifications of Feynman diagrams for non-relativistic many-fermion systems, which are currently referred to as Goldstone diagrams. In 1957, he proved the linked-cluster theorem, showing that only connected diagrams contribute to the calculation.

Goldstone was a research fellow of Trinity College, Cambridge, from 1956 to 1960 and held visiting research posts at Copenhagen, CERN and Harvard. During this time, his research focus shifted to particle physics and he investigated the nature of relativistic field theories with spontaneously broken symmetries. With Abdus Salam and Steven Weinberg, he proved that in such theories zero-mass particles (Nambu–Goldstone bosons) must exist.

From 1962 to 1976, Goldstone was a faculty member at Cambridge. In the early 1970s, with Peter Goddard, Claudio Rebbi and Charles Thorn, he worked out the light-cone quantization theory of relativistic strings. He moved to the USA in 1977 as Professor of Physics at MIT, where he was appointed the Cecil and Ida Green Professor of Physics in 1983 and was director of the MIT Center for Theoretical Physics in 1983–1989.

He published research on solitons in quantum field theory with Roman Jackiw and Frank Wilczek, and on the quantum strong law of large numbers with Edward Farhi and Samuel Gutmann. Since 1997, he has worked, with Farhi, Gutmann, Michael Sipser and Andrew Childs, on quantum computing. Together they introduced adiabatic quantum computation in 2000 and the quantum approximate optimization (QAOA) algorithm in 2014.

Goldstone died on 12 October 2026, aged 93.

== Awards and honours ==
- Fellow of the Royal Society (elected 1977),
- Fellow of the American Academy of Arts and Sciences (1977),
- Fellow of the American Physical Society (1987).
- Honorary Fellow of Trinity College, Cambridge (2000).
- Dannie Heineman Prize for Mathematical Physics of the American Physical Society (1981) "For his contribution to nuclear physics, condensed matter physics and to quantum field theory, in establishing the first rigorous diagrammatic technique for the many-body problem and in proving a fundamental theorem on spontaneously broken global symmetry."
- Guthrie Medal of the Institute of Physics (London) (1983)
- Dirac Medal of the International Center for Theoretical Physics (Trieste) (1991) shared with Stanley Mandelstam, "for his fundamental clarification of the phenomenon of spontaneous symmetry violation in relativistic quantum field theory."

== See also ==
- Adiabatic quantum computation
- Effective action
- Goldstinos
- Sgoldstino
- Goldstone's theorem
