= Ivan Vitev =

American academic

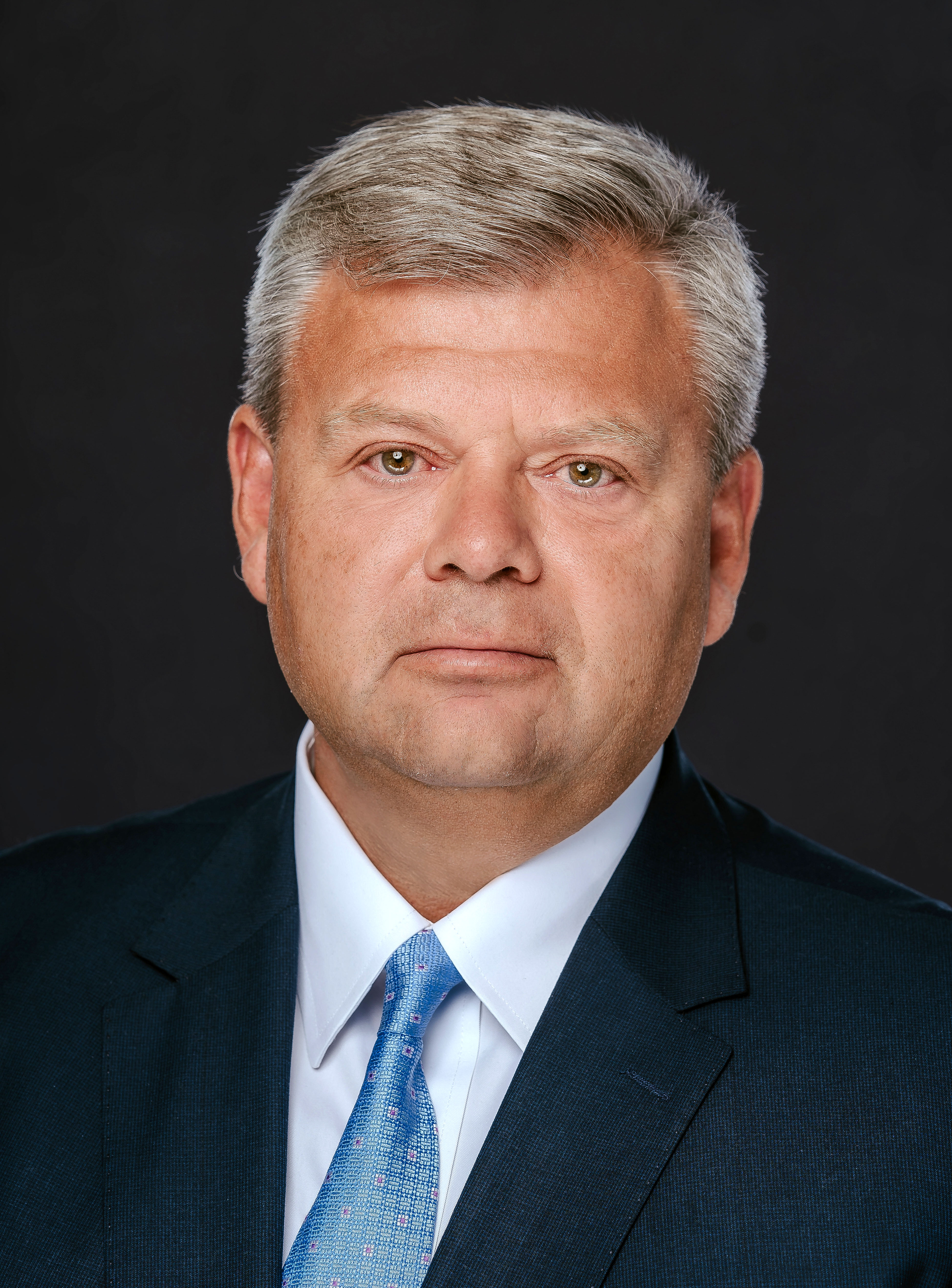
- Born: Bulgaria
- Education: Sofia University; Columbia University
- Known for: Jet quenching; GLV formalism; SCET with Glauber gluons; heavy flavor in QCD matter; Electron‑Ion Collider theory
- Awards: PECASE (2008); DOE Early Career Award (2012); APS Fellow (2012); LANL Fellow (2023)
- Scientific career
- Fields: Theoretical nuclear physics
- Workplaces: Los Alamos National Laboratory
- Doctoral advisor: Miklos Gyulassy

Ivan Vitev is a Bulgarian‑American theoretical physicist known for his pioneering contributions to Quantum chromodynamics (QCD), particularly the study of parton propagation in matter, jet quenching, and heavy flavor dynamics in high‑energy nuclear collisions. He is currently a distinguished scientist at Los Alamos National Laboratory (LANL), where he leads the QCD theory effort in the Theoretical Division.

== Early life and education ==
Vitev was born in Bulgaria and earned undergraduate and master's degrees in physics and physics education from Sofia University "St. Kliment Ohridski" in 1995. He later earned a Ph.D. in theoretical nuclear physics from Columbia University in 2002, under the supervision of Miklos Gyulassy.

== Career ==
After postdoctoral work at Iowa State University, Vitev joined Los Alamos National Laboratory as a J. Robert Oppenheimer Fellow in 2004 and became a staff scientist in 2007. In recognition of his achievements, Vitev was awarded the Presidential Early Career Award for Scientists and Engineers (PECASE) in 2008., was elected a Fellow of the American Physical Society in 2012, and named a Fellow of Los Alamos National Laboratory in 2023.

== Research contributions ==
=== Gyulassy–Lévai–Vitev (GLV) parton energy loss formalism ===
As a doctoral student, Vitev co‑developed the GLV formalism for non‑Abelian parton energy loss in dense QCD matter. This opacity expansion method allowed a systematic treatment of induced gluon radiation and provided theoretical interpretation for suppression phenomena observed at the Relativistic Heavy Ion Collider (RHIC) and the Large Hadron Collider (LHC). He also extended this approach to describe cold nuclear matter effects.

=== Jets and jet substructure in QCD matter ===
Vitev has made significant contributions to jet cross section theory and substructure in heavy-ion collisions, including predictions for inclusive jet yields and the development of boson-tagged observables. He also modeled the coupling of jets to collective flow.

=== Effective field theories in QCD: SCET and Glauber gluons ===
Vitev made early attempts to extend Soft Collinear Effective Theory (SCET) by incorporating Glauber gluons to derive medium-induced splitting kernels. These methods were applied to jet quenching calculations in both hot and cold nuclear matter, and modeled Glauber exchange with a medium as an external field coupled to a collinear sector. A full rigorous Glauber sector was later derived by Ira Rothstein and Iain Stewart through matching QCD onto SCET, who derive a general basis of Glauber operators that includes interactions involving both soft and collinear sectors, together with their rapidity evolution.

=== Heavy flavor and quarkonium dynamics ===
His work includes development of effective theories for heavy flavor and quarkonium transport in the Quark-Gluon Plasma (QGP), including mechanisms of dissociation.

=== Cold nuclear matter and dynamical shadowing ===
Vitev's research includes theoretical descriptions of parton broadening and Drell–Yan process suppression in proton–nucleus collisions, as well as QCD power corrections for nuclear shadowing.

=== Electron–Ion Collider physics ===
He has developed QCD frameworks to describe hadron and jet production at the future Electron–ion collider, including jet charge modification and transverse energy correlators.

== Mentorship and leadership ==
Vitev has mentored over 20 postdoctoral researchers and numerous undergraduate and graduate students at LANL. Many have gone on to academic and industry positions. He co-organized the Santa Fe Jets and Heavy Flavor Workshop, Quark matter conference, and theory efforts for the Electron-ion collider.

== Selected honors and awards ==
- Fellow of Los Alamos National Laboratory, 2023
- LANL Fellows Prize for Research, 2020
- Fellow of the American Physical Society, 2012
- DOE Early Career Award, 2012
- Presidential Early Career Award for Scientists and Engineers (PECASE), 2008
- J. Robert Oppenheimer Fellowship, 2004–2007
