= Martin Savage =

Martin Savage may refer to:

- Martin Savage (Irish republican) (1897–1919), officer in the Irish Republican Army
- Martin Savage (actor), English actor
- Martin J. Savage, Australian physicist

== See also ==
- Martin Savidge (born 1958), Canadian-American television news correspondent
