= MIT Center for Theoretical Physics =

Center at the Massachusetts Institute of Technology

- Established: 1968
- Field of research: Theoretical physics
- Director: Iain Stewart
- Faculty: Alan Guth; Frank Wilczek; Peter Shor; Max Tegmark; Jeffrey Goldstone
- Location: Cambridge, Massachusetts, United States
- Operating agency: MIT
- Nobel laureates: Frank Wilczek; Steven Weinberg

The MIT Center for Theoretical Physics (CTP) is the hub of theoretical nuclear physics, particle physics, and quantum information research at MIT. It is a subdivision of MIT Laboratory for Nuclear Science and Department of Physics.

== Research ==
CTP activities range from string theory and cosmology at the highest energies down through unification and beyond-the-standard-model physics, through the standard model, to QCD, hadrons, quark matter, and nuclei at the low energy scale.

Members of the CTP are also currently working on quantum computation and on energy policy.

== Members ==
In addition to the 15 MIT faculty members working in the CTP, at any one time there are roughly a dozen postdoctoral fellows, and as many, or more, long-term visitors working at the postdoctoral or faculty level. The CTP supports 25-35 MIT graduate students, who work with the faculty and postdocs on problems across the energy spectrum.

Current research areas in the center include particle physics, cosmology, string theory, phenomenology in and beyond the standard model, quantum field theory, lattice QCD, condensed matter physics, quantum computing, and energy research.

Notable current faculty include Nobel Laureate Frank Wilczek, Jeffrey Goldstone, inflationary cosmologist Alan Guth, cosmologist Max Tegmark, and quantum information scientist Peter Shor. Past CTP faculty members include US Secretary of Energy Ernest Moniz, Breakthrough Prize winner Daniel Freedman, particle theorist and author Lisa Randall, and many others.

== Directors ==
- Herman Feshbach, 1967–73
- Francis Low, 1973–76
- Arthur Kerman, 1976–83
- Jeffrey Goldstone, 1983–89
- John Negele, 1989–98
- Robert Jaffe, 1998–2004
- Eddie Farhi, 2004–16
- Washington Taylor IV, 2016–19
- Iain Stewart, 2019–present

== Faculty ==
Current and former faculty members in the CTP include:

- Michel Baranger, student of Hans Bethe, made contributions to plasma spectroscopy, nuclear collective motion, and quantum chaos
- Netta Engelhardt, 2021 New Horizons in Physics Prize recipient for work on black holes
- Edward Farhi, particle-physicist turned quantum information theorist
- Herman Feshbach, founding director of the CTP
- Daniel Freedman, Breakthrough Prize winner
- Sergio Fubini, pioneer of string theory
- Roscoe Giles, computer engineer and theoretical physicist; first African-American to earn a theoretical physics Ph.D. from Stanford
- Jeffrey Goldstone, namesake of Goldstone bosons
- Alan Guth, discoverer of inflation
- Daniel Harlow, 2019 New Horizons in Physics Prize recipient for contributions to "quantum information, quantum field theory, and gravity"
- Aram Harrow, quantum information scientist
- Kerson Huang, known for contributions to statistical physics and quantum field theory alongside C. N. Yang, T. D. Lee, and Steven Weinberg
- Roman Jackiw, of the Jackiw-Teitelboim model of 2d gravity
- Robert Jaffe, CTP director, known for MIT Bag Model
- Xiangdong Ji, recipient of Herman Feshbach Prize in nuclear physics
- Kenneth Johnson, famous for fundamental contributions to quantum field theory and quark substructure
- David Kaiser, cosmologist and historian of science
- Francis Low, CTP director, Manhattan project alumnus and co-founder of Union of Concerned Scientists
- Samir Mathur, string theorist and architect of "fuzzball" program for understanding black hole microstates
- Ernest Moniz, former U.S. Secretary of Energy
- John Negele, CTP director, nuclear physicist
- Lisa Randall, particle physicist, cosmologist, and popular physics author; first female professor in the CTP
- Peter Shor, quantum information scientist known for Shor's algorithm
- Isadore Singer, winner of the Abel Prize
- Tracy Slatyer, known for Fermi bubbles; second tenured female professor in the CTP
- Max Tegmark, notable cosmologist and popular physics author
- Jesse Thaler, Director of NSF AI Institute for Artificial Intelligence in Fundamental Interactions
- Charles Thorn, noted string theorist
- Gabriele Veneziano, pioneer of string theory
- Felix Villars, of Pauli-Villars regularization method in quantum field theory
- Steven Weinberg, Nobel Laureate
- Victor Weisskopf, former MIT physics department chair
- Frank Wilczek, Nobel Laureate known for asymptotic freedom and axions
- James Young, notable nuclear physicist; founding member of National Society of Black Physicists; first tenured black professor in the MIT Physics Department
- Barton Zwiebach, Peruvian string theorist, made central contributions to string field theory

== See also ==
- MIT Center for Theoretical Physics faculty
- MIT Center for Theoretical Physics people
