= Isgur =

Isgur is a surname. Notable people with the surname include:

- Nathan Isgur (1947–2001), American theoretical physicist
- Sarah Isgur (born 1982), American lawyer and political analyst
