= Maryland Center for Fundamental Physics =

Research center at the University of Maryland

Coordinates: 38.98699°N 76.94376°W

- Established: 2007
- Field of research: Gravity; Particle physics Theoretical physics
- Director: Raman Sundrum
- Affiliations: University of Maryland, College Park

The Maryland Center for Fundamental Physics (MCFP) is a research institute at the University of Maryland, College Park focused on theoretical physics.

== About ==
The MCFP was founded in 2007 and is currently directed by Raman Sundrum. It is a subdivision of the Department of Physics as well as the College of Computer, Mathematical, and Natural Sciences at the University of Maryland. It houses research in theoretical elementary particle physics, gravitation, and quarks.

== Members ==
Members currently include 13 full-time faculty, as well as many postdocs, graduate students, and visitors. Present and past faculty include:

- Alessandra Buonanno, gravitational wave physicist
- Sylvester James Gates, string theorist, recipient of National Medal of Science
- Oscar Greenberg, known for color charge
- Ted Jacobson, gravitational physicist
- Xiangdong Ji, former director of MCTP, nuclear physicist, recipient of Herman Feshbach Prize
- Charles Misner, known for his book on gravitation, recipient of Dannie Heineman Prize for Mathematical Physics
- Rabindra Mohapatra, theoretical particle physicist
- Jogesh Pati, particle physicist, recipient of Dirac Medal
- Raman Sundrum, director, known for Randall–Sundrum models
- Aron Wall, winner of 2019 New Horizons Prize in physics.

== See also ==
- Institute for Theoretical Physics (disambiguation)
- Center for Theoretical Physics (disambiguation)
