= John Donoghue (physicist) =

American theoretical physicist (b. 1950)

- Born: November 30, 1950 (age 75); Manhasset, New York
- Education: University of Notre Dame; University of Massachusetts Amherst
- Known for: Effective field theory
- Awards: Fellow of the American Physical Society (1986); Sakurai Prize (2026)
- Scientific career
- Fields: Physics
- Workplaces: Massachusetts Institute of Technology; Carnegie Mellon University; University of Massachusetts Amherst
- Doctoral advisor: Barry Holstein

John Francis Donoghue (born November 30, 1950) is an American theoretical physicist whose research primarily focuses on particle physics, general relativity and quantum gravity, with a particular emphasis on the use of effective field theory methods. He is Distinguished Professor Emeritus at the University of Massachusetts Amherst.

== Education and career ==
John Donoghue was born on November 30, 1950, in Manhasset, New York. He received a B.S. in physics from the University of Notre Dame in 1972 and earned his Ph.D. in physics from the University of Massachusetts (UMass) Amherst in 1976, with Barry Holstein as his advisor. Following postdoctoral appointments at the Massachusetts Institute of Technology and Carnegie Mellon University, Donoghue returned to UMass Amherst in 1980, where he spent the remainder of his academic career. He retired in 2015 but has continued his research.

== Research ==
Donoghue began his career during a period marked by the discovery of the charm and bottom quarks, initially focusing on the phenomenology of the quark model. His early work included studies of weak nonleptonic decays and tests of parity (P) and charge-parity (CP) symmetry violations. He co-developed the Deplanques–Donoghue–Holstein (DDH) model (named after Bertrand Deplanques, Donoghue, and Barry Holstein) for investigating parity non-conserving processes in nuclear interactions.

Donoghue’s work in particle phenomenology also contributed to the development of chiral perturbation theory, an effective field theory approach to low-energy quantum chromodynamics. These efforts were often conducted in collaboration with his UMass Amherst colleagues Barry Holstein and Eugene Golowich.

In the 1990s, building on his expertise in nonrenormalizable effective theories, Donoghue demonstrated that general relativity could be treated as an effective field theory at low energies. This work provided a framework for calculating quantum corrections to classical gravity in a model-independent way, without requiring a complete theory of quantum gravity.

In 1998, Donoghue co-authored a paper with V. Agrawal, S.M. Barr, and D. Seckel that applied anthropic principle reasoning to the parameters of the Standard Model, contributing to the concept of multiverse and the landscape of possible physical laws.

== Honors ==
In 1989, Donoghue was elected a Fellow of the American Physical Society for his “continued contributions to the theory and phenomenology of hadrons, especially in the studies of weak decays, CP violation, hadron spectroscopy, and chiral symmetry.” In 2005, he was awarded the UMass Amherst Chancellor’s Medal, and in 2011 was named a Distinguished Professor. He was the recipient of the 2026 Sakurai Prize "for original and lasting contributions to the development of effective field theories, including work on gravity as an effective quantum field theory, and important contributions to chiral perturbation theory."

== Bibliography ==
Donoghue is the author of over 300 scientific publications.

He has also co-authored two textbooks:

- The Dynamics of the Standard Model (with Eugene Golowich and Barry Holstein)
- A Prelude to Quantum Field Theory (with Lorenzo Sorbo)
