= Mark B. Wise =

Canadian-American theoretical physicist (1953–2026)

Mark Wise
- Born: November 9, 1953; Montreal, Quebec, Canada
- Died: July 10, 2026 (aged 72); Pasadena, California, United States
- Citizenship: Canada, United States
- Education: University of Toronto (BS, MS); Stanford University (PhD)
- Known for: Heavy quark effective theory Goldberger–Wise mechanism
- Awards: American Academy of Arts and Sciences; National Academy of Sciences; Sakurai Prize; Julius Wess Award
- Scientific career
- Fields: Theoretical physics Particle physics Physical cosmology Finance
- Workplaces: Harvard Junior Fellow; California Institute of Technology
- Thesis: Strong Effects in Weak Nonleptonic Decays (1980)
- Doctoral advisor: Fred Gilman
- Doctoral students: Mark Adler; Walter D. Goldberger; Alejandro Jenkins; Martin J. Savage; Iain Stewart; Roxanne Springer; Sandip Trivedi

Mark Brian Wise (November 9, 1953 – July 10, 2026) was a Canadian-American theoretical physicist. He conducted research in elementary particle physics and cosmology. He is best known for his role in the development of heavy quark effective theory (HQET), a mathematical formalism that has allowed physicists to make predictions about otherwise intractable problems in the theory of the strong nuclear interactions. He also published work on mathematical models for finance and risk assessment.

== Early life and education ==
Wise was born in Montreal on November 9, 1953. From the age of four he grew up in Toronto. He was educated at the University of Toronto (B.S., 1976; M.S., 1977) before moving to the USA to attend Stanford University (Ph.D., 1980). While still a student, he co-authored a book on mathematical methods in physics with Toronto professor Lynn Trainor.

== Academic career ==
With Fred Gilman, his graduate advisor at Stanford, Wise wrote several highly influential papers on experimental predictions of the quark model. He was a junior fellow at the Harvard Society of Fellows from 1980 to 1983, and then became an assistant professor at the California Institute of Technology (Caltech). He was promoted to associate professor in 1984 and to full professor in 1985. From 1984 to 1987 he was a fellow of the Alfred P. Sloan Foundation.

In 1992 he was appointed John A. McCone Professor of High Energy Physics at Caltech, a position that he held until his death in 2026. As a professor at Caltech, Wise supervised over three dozen doctoral students in theoretical physics.

== Other pursuits ==
Wise worked as consultant for PIMCO, an investment management firm specializing in fixed income. He collaborated with PIMCO's Vineer Bhansali and the two co-authored a textbook on fixed income finance, published by McGraw Hill in 2010. Wise regarded his work on mathematical finance and his own personal investing as a "hobby". He also acted as science consultant for the movie Iron Man 2 (2010).

== Honors ==
Wise shared the 2001 Sakurai Prize for Theoretical Particle Physics with Nathan Isgur and Mikhail Voloshin, "for the construction of the heavy quark mass expansion and the discovery of the heavy quark symmetry in quantum chromodynamics, which led to a quantitative theory of the decays of c and b flavored hadrons." He was elected member of the American Academy of Arts and Sciences in 2002, fellow of the American Physical Society in 2003, and member of the US National Academy of Sciences in 2007. In 2021 he received the Karlsruhe Institute of Technology's Julius Wess Award for "his outstanding and groundbreaking scientific achievements in the field of theoretical particle physics, in particular the development of modern effective field theories for flavor physics, and his high international reputation."

== Death ==
Wise died on July 10, 2026, at the age of 72. His friend and colleague at Caltech, John Preskill, eulogized him as "one of the most influential figures in theoretical particle physics of his generation."

== Works ==
=== Books ===
- Trainor, Lynn E. H.; Wise, Mark B. (1979). From Physical Concept to Mathematical Structure: an Introduction to Theoretical Physics. Toronto: University of Toronto Press. ISBN 0-8020-5432-3.
- Manohar, Aneesh B.; Wise, Mark B. (2000). Heavy Quark Physics. Cambridge: Cambridge University Press. doi:10.1017/9781009402125. ISBN 1-0094-0211-0.
- Bhansali, Vineer; Wise, Mark B. (2010). Fixed Income Finance: A Quantitative Approach. New York: McGraw Hill. ISBN 978-0071763417.

=== Lectures ===
- Wise, Mark B. (1997). "Heavy Quark Physics". Les Houches Summer School in Theoretical Physics, Session 68: Probing the Standard Model of Particle Interactions. Les Houches School of Physics. pp. 1051–1089. arXiv:hep-ph/9805468.

=== Selected articles ===
- Gilman, Frederick J.; Wise, Mark B. (1979). "Effective Hamiltonian for $\Delta S = 1$ weak nonleptonic decays in the six-quark model". Physical Review D. 20 (9): 2392–2407. doi:10.1103/PhysRevD.20.2392.
- Abbott, L. F.; Wise, Mark B. (1981). "Dimension of a quantum‐mechanical path". American Journal of Physics. 49 (9): 37–39. doi:10.1119/1.12657.
- Wise, Mark B.; Georgi, Howard; Glashow, Sheldon (1981). "SU(5) and the Invisible Axion". Physical Review Letters. 47 (6): 402–404. doi:10.1103/PhysRevLett.47.402.
- Álvarez-Gaumé, Luis; Polchinski, Joseph; Wise, Mark B. (1983). "Minimal low-energy supergravity". Nuclear Physics B. 221 (2): 931–934. doi:10.1016/0550-3213(83)90591-6.
- Preskill, John; Wise, Mark B.; Wilczek, Frank (1983). "Cosmology of the invisible axion". Physics Letters B. 120 (1–3): 127–132. doi:10.1016/0370-2693(83)90637-8.
- Politzer, H. David; Wise, Mark B. (1988). "Leading logarithms of heavy quark masses in processes with light and heavy quarks". Physics Letters B. 206 (4): 681–684. doi:10.1016/0370-2693(88)90718-6.
- Abbott, L. F.; Wise, Mark B. (1984). "Constraints on generalized inflationary cosmologies". Nuclear Physics B. 244 (2): 541–548. doi:10.1016/0550-3213(84)90329-8.
- Isgur, Nathan; Wise, Mark B. (1990). "Weak transition form factors between heavy mesons". Physics Letters B. 237 (3–4): 527–530. doi:10.1016/0370-2693(90)91219-2.
- Kaplan, David B.; Savage, Martin J.; Wise, Mark B. (1998). "A new expansion for nucleon-nucleon interactions". Physics Letters B. 424 (3–4): 390–396. arXiv:nucl-th/9801034. doi:10.1016/S0370-2693(98)00210-X.
- Mehen, Thomas C.; Stewart, Iain W.; Wise, Mark B. (1999). "Wigner Symmetry in the Limit of Large Scattering Lengths". Physical Review Letters. 83 (5): 931–934. arXiv:hep-ph/9902370. Bibcode:1999PhRvL..83..931M. doi:10.1103/physrevlett.83.931. S2CID 32242436.
- Gomis, Jaume; Mehen, Thomas C.; Wise, Mark B. (2000). "Quantum field theories with compact noncommutative extra dimensions". Journal of High Energy Physics. 2000 (8): 029. arXiv:hep-th/0006160. Bibcode:2000JHEP...08..029G. doi:10.1088/1126-6708/2000/08/029. S2CID 18641968.
- Mehen, Thomas C.; Stewart, Iain W.; Wise, Mark B. (2000). "Conformal invariance for non-relativistic field theory". Physics Letters B. 474 (1–2): 145–152. arXiv:hep-th/9910025. Bibcode:2000PhLB..474..145M. doi:10.1016/s0370-2693(00)00006-x. S2CID 15076895.
- Hsu, Stephen D. H.; Jenkins, Alejandro; Wise, Mark B. (2004). "Gradient instability for $w < -1$". Physics Letters B. 597 (3–4): 270–274. arXiv:astro-ph/0406043. doi:10.1016/j.physletb.2004.07.025.
- Bhansali, Vineer; Wise, Mark B. (2009). "How valuable are the TALF puts?". Journal of Fixed Income. 19 (2): 71–75. doi:10.3905/jfi.2009.19.2.071. SSRN 1447430.
- Arnold, Jonathan M.; Fornal, Bartosz; Wise, Mark B. (2013). "Simplified models with baryon number violation but no proton decay". Physical Review D. 87 (7): 270–274. arXiv:1212.4556. doi:10.1103/PhysRevD.87.075004.
