= Thomas Carlos Mehen =

American physicist

Tom Mehen
- Born: September 8, 1970; Tegucigalpa, Honduras
- Died: December 29, 2024 (aged 54); Chapel Hill, North Carolina
- Education: University of Virginia; Johns Hopkins University
- Children: 3
- Awards: DOE Outstanding Junior Investigator Award
- Scientific career
- Fields: Nuclear physics Quantum chromodynamics Effective field theory
- Institutions: Duke University; Duke Kunshan University; California Institute of Technology; Ohio State University
- Thesis: Phenomenology of heavy quarks and quarkonium
- Academic advisors: Adam Falk

Thomas Carlos Mehen (September 8, 1970 - December 29, 2024) was an American physicist. His research consisted of primarily quantum chromodynamics (QCD) and the application of effective field theory to problems in hadronic physics. He also worked on effective field theory for non-relativistic particles whose short range interactions are characterized by a large scattering length, as well as novel field theories which arise from unusual limits of string theory. He died of natural causes on December 29, 2024.

== Early life ==
Mehen was born in Tegucigalpa, Honduras where he learned Spanish as his first language. His parents were Thomas and Elizabeth Mehen. In 1974 at the age of three he relocated with his family to McLean, Virginia, USA.

== Career ==
Mehen was educated at the University of Virginia (B.S., 1992), and Johns Hopkins University (M.A., Ph.D., 1998). He served as a research associate and John A. McCone Postdoctoral Scholar in the Division of Mathematics, Physics and Astronomy at the California Institute of Technology from 1997 to 2000. He served as a research associate and University Postdoctoral Fellow in the Department of Physics at the Ohio State University from 2000–2001. In 2002 he joined the Department of Physics at Duke University as assistant professor, being promoted up to full professor in 2016. He also served as a visiting professor at Duke Kunshan University.

In 2005 Mehen received an Outstanding Junior Investigator Award in Nuclear Physics by the United States Department of Energy. He contributed almost 100 published works and was a lecturer in his field.

== Publications ==
1. Kim, Chul; Mehen, Thomas (2009). "Color Octet Scalar Bound States at the LHC". Physical Review D. 79 (3) 035011. arXiv:0812.0307. Bibcode:2009PhRvD..79c5011K. doi:10.1103/PhysRevD.79.035011. S2CID 119249181.
2. Fleming, Sean; Mehen, Thomas (2008). "Hadronic Decays of the X(3872) to χ_{cJ} in Effective Field Theory". Physical Review D. 78 (9) 094019. arXiv:0807.2674. Bibcode:2008PhRvD..78i4019F. doi:10.1103/PhysRevD.78.094019. S2CID 118439301.
3. Kim, Chul; Leibovich, Adam K.; Mehen, Thomas (2008). "Nonperturbative Charming Penguin Contributions to Isospin Asymmetries in Radiative B decays". Physical Review D. 78 (5) 054024. arXiv:0805.1735. Bibcode:2008PhRvD..78e4024K. doi:10.1103/PhysRevD.78.054024. S2CID 118701906.
4. Mehen, Thomas (2007). "On Non-Relativistic Conformal Field Theory and Trapped Atoms: Virial Theorems and the State-Operator Correspondence in Three Dimensions". Physical Review A. 78 (1) 013614. arXiv:0712.0867. Bibcode:2008PhRvA..78a3614M. doi:10.1103/PhysRevA.78.013614. S2CID 118707321.
5. Idilbi, Ahmad; Mehen, Thomas (2007). "Demonstration of the Equivalence of Soft and Zero-Bin Subtractions". Physical Review D. 76 (9) 094015. arXiv:0707.1101. Bibcode:2007PhRvD..76i4015I. doi:10.1103/PhysRevD.76.094015.
6. Fleming, S.; Kusunoki, M.; Mehen, T.; van Kolck, U. (2007). "Pion Interactions in the X(3872)". Physical Review D. 76 (3) 034006. arXiv:hep-ph/0703168. Bibcode:2007PhRvD..76c4006F. doi:10.1103/PhysRevD.76.034006. S2CID 119497972.
7. Mehen, Thomas; Idilbi, Ahmad (2007). "On the Equivalence of Soft and Zero-Bin Subtractions". Physical Review D. 75 (11) 114017. arXiv:hep-ph/0702022. Bibcode:2007PhRvD..75k4017I. doi:10.1103/PhysRevD.75.114017. S2CID 27024410.
8. Dunn, Alan; Mehen, Thomas (2006). "Generalized *-products, Wilson lines and the solution of the Seiberg-Witten equations". Journal of High Energy Physics. 2000 (12): 008. arXiv:hep-ph/0610202. Bibcode:2000JHEP...12..008M. doi:10.1088/1126-6708/2000/12/008.
9. Mehen, Thomas; Tiburzi, Brian C. (2006). "Doubly Heavy Baryons and Quark-Diquark Symmetry in Quenched and Partially Quenched Chiral Perturbation Theory". Physical Review D. 74 (5) 054505. arXiv:hep-lat/0607023. Bibcode:2006PhRvD..74e4505M. doi:10.1103/PhysRevD.74.054505. S2CID 119010760.
10. Fleming, Sean; Leibovich, Adam K.; Mehen, Thomas (2006). "Resummation of Large Endpoint Corrections to Color-Octet J/psi Photoproduction". Physical Review D. 74 (11) 114004. arXiv:hep-ph/0607121. Bibcode:2006PhRvD..74k4004F. doi:10.1103/PhysRevD.74.114004. S2CID 119079388.
11. Mehen, Thomas (2001). "Perturbative Pions in Effective Field Theory for Nucleon Interactions". Chiral Dynamics. pp. 434–435. doi:10.1142/9789812810977_0082. ISBN 978-981-02-4723-2.
12. Fleming, Sean; Leibovich, Adam K.; Mehen, Thomas (May 2006). "J/Ψ PHOTO-PRODUCTION AT LARGE Z IN SOFT COLLINEAR EFFECTIVE THEORY". New Trends in HERA Physics 2005: 239–250. arXiv:hep-ph/0512194. Bibcode:2006nthp.conf..239F. doi:10.1142/9789812773524_0022. ISBN 978-981-256-816-8. S2CID 15369742.
13. Hu, Jie; Mehen, Thomas (2006). "Chiral Lagrangian with Heavy Quark-Diquark Symmetry". Physical Review D. 73 (5) 054003. arXiv:hep-ph/0511321. Bibcode:2006PhRvD..73e4003H. doi:10.1103/PhysRevD.73.054003. S2CID 28487617.
14. Fleming, Sean; Mehen, Thomas (2006). "Doubly Heavy Baryons, Heavy Quark-Di Quark Symmetry and NRQCD". Physical Review D. 73 (3) 034502. arXiv:hep-ph/0509313. Bibcode:2006PhRvD..73c4502F. doi:10.1103/PhysRevD.73.034502. S2CID 56195115.
15. Mehen, Thomas (2005). "Excited D_{s} (and Pentaquarks) in Chiral Perturbation Theory". Acta Physica Polonica B. 36 (7): 2341–2350. arXiv:hep-ph/0506219. Bibcode:2005AcPPB..36.2341M.
16. Mehen, Thomas; Tiburzi, Brian C. (2005). "Quarks with Twisted Boundary Conditions in the Epsilon Regime". Physical Review D. 72 (14501) 014501. arXiv:hep-lat/0505014. Bibcode:2005PhRvD..72a4501M. doi:10.1103/PhysRevD.72.014501. S2CID 119481669.
17. Mehen, Thomas; Springer, Roxanne (2005). "Even- and Odd-Parity Charmed Meson Masses in Heavy Hadron Chiral Perturbation Theory". Physical Review D. 72 (3) 034006. arXiv:hep-ph/0503134. Bibcode:2005PhRvD..72c4006M. doi:10.1103/PhysRevD.72.034006. S2CID 54173137.
18. Mehen, Thomas; Springer, Roxanne P. (2004). "Heavy-Quark Symmetry and the Electromagnetic Decays of Excited Charmed Strange Mesons". Physical Review D. 70 (7) 074014. arXiv:hep-ph/0407181. Bibcode:2004PhRvD..70g4014M. doi:10.1103/PhysRevD.70.074014. S2CID 32623279.
19. Mehen, Thomas; Schat, Carlos (2004). "Determining Pentaquark Quantum Numbers from Strong Decays". Physics Letters B. 588 (1–2): 67–73. arXiv:hep-ph/0401107. Bibcode:2004PhLB..588...67M. doi:10.1016/j.physletb.2004.03.039. S2CID 119330552.
20. Mehen, Thomas (2004). "Recent Developments in Heavy Quark and Quarkonium Production". Acta Phys. Pol. B. 35 (1): 121–130. arXiv:hep-ph/0312239. Bibcode:2004AcPPB..35..121M. doi:10.1016/S0370-2693(00)00006-X.
21. Mehen, Thomas (2004). "Charm production asymmetries from heavy-quark recombination". AIP Conference Proceedings. 698 (2004): 508–512. arXiv:hep-ph/0306178. Bibcode:2004AIPC..698..508M. doi:10.1063/1.1664288. S2CID 32782960.
22. Mehen, Thomas (2004). "Charm production asymmetries from heavy-quark recombination". AIP Conference Proceedings. 698 (2004): 508–512. arXiv:hep-ph/0306178. Bibcode:2004AIPC..698..508M. doi:10.1063/1.1664288. S2CID 32782960.
23. Braaten, Eric; Kusunoki, Masaoki; Jia, Yu; Mehen, Thomas (2004). "Λ^{+}_{c}/Λ^{-}_{c} Asymmetry in Hadroproduction from Heavy-Quark Recombination". Physical Review D. 70 (5) 054021. arXiv:hep-ph/0304280. Bibcode:2004PhRvD..70e4021B. doi:10.1103/PhysRevD.70.054021. S2CID 119010053.
24. Mehen, Thomas (2004). "Charm production asymmetries from heavy-quark recombination". Journal of Physics G: Nuclear and Particle Physics. 30 (1): S295–S304. arXiv:hep-ph/0306178. Bibcode:2004JPhG...30S.295M. doi:10.1088/0954-3899/30/1/035.
25. Kaiser, Roland; Manohar, Aneesh V.; Mehen, Thomas (2003). "Isospin violation in e^{+}e^{−} → BB̅". Physical Review Letters. 90 (14) 142001. arXiv:hep-ph/0208194. Bibcode:2003PhRvL..90n2001K. doi:10.1103/PhysRevLett.90.142001. PMID 12731909. S2CID 30004064.
26. Heavy quark recombination and charm production asymmetries. Tom Mehen. May 2002. 12pp. Presented at DPF 2002: The Meeting of the Division of Particles and Fields of the American Physical Society, Williamsburg, Virginia, 24–28 May 2002.
27. Mehen, Thomas; Wecht, Brian (2003). "Gauge Fields and Scalars in Rolling Tachyon Backgrounds". Journal of High Energy Physics. 2003 (2): 058. arXiv:hep-th/0206212. Bibcode:2003JHEP...02..058M. doi:10.1088/1126-6708/2003/02/058. S2CID 119416422.
28. Braaten, Eric; Jia, Yu; Mehen, Thomas (2002). "The Leading Particle Effect from Heavy-Quark Recombination". Physical Review Letters. 89 (12) 122002. arXiv:hep-ph/0205149. Bibcode:2002PhRvL..89l2002B. doi:10.1103/PhysRevLett.89.122002. PMID 12225080. S2CID 24126331.
29. Manohar, Aneesh V.; Mehen, Thomas; Pirjol, Dan; Stewart, Iain W. (2002). "Reparameterization Invariance for Collinear Operators". Physics Letters B. 539 (1–2): 59–66. arXiv:hep-ph/0204229. Bibcode:2002PhLB..539...59M. doi:10.1016/S0370-2693(02)02029-4. S2CID 119462371.
30. Braaten, Eric; Jia, Yu; Mehen, Thomas (2001). "Charm-Anticharm Asymmetries in Photoproduction from Heavy-Quark Recombination". Physical Review D. 66 (2002) 014003. arXiv:hep-ph/0111296. Bibcode:2002PhRvD..66a4003B. doi:10.1103/PhysRevD.66.014003. S2CID 14709159.
31. Braaten, Eric; Jia, Yu; Mehen, Thomas (2002). "B Production Asymmetries in Perturbative QCD". Physical Review D. 66 (3) 034003. arXiv:hep-ph/0108201. Bibcode:2002PhRvD..66c4003B. doi:10.1103/PhysRevD.66.034003. S2CID 119401647.
32. Braaten, Eric; Hammer, H. -W.; Mehen, Thomas (2002). "The Dilute Bose-Einstein Condensate with Large Scattering Length". Physical Review Letters. 88 (4) 040401. arXiv:cond-mat/0108380. Bibcode:2002PhRvL..88d0401B. doi:10.1103/PhysRevLett.88.040401. PMID 11801094. S2CID 16316244.
33. Hammer, H. -W.; Mehen, Thomas (2001). "Range Corrections to Doublet S-Wave Neutron-Deuteron Scattering". Physics Letters B. 516 (3–4): 353–361. arXiv:nucl-th/0105072. Bibcode:2001PhLB..516..353H. doi:10.1016/S0370-2693(01)00918-2. S2CID 16983731.
34. Mehen, Thomas; Wise, Mark B. (2000). "Generalized *-Products, Wilson Lines and the Solution of the Seiberg-Witten Equations". Journal of High Energy Physics. 2000 (12): 008. arXiv:hep-th/0010204. Bibcode:2000JHEP...12..008M. doi:10.1088/1126-6708/2000/12/008. S2CID 8195434.
35. Aharony, Ofer; Gomis, Jaume; Mehen, Thomas (2000). "On Theories with Light-Like Noncommutativity". Journal of High Energy Physics. 2000 (9): 023. arXiv:hep-th/0006236. Bibcode:2000JHEP...09..023A. doi:10.1088/1126-6708/2000/09/023. S2CID 13029031.
36. Gomis, Jaume; Mehen, Thomas; Wise, Mark B. (2000). "Quantum Field Theories with Compact Noncommutative Extra Dimensions". Journal of High Energy Physics. 2000 (8): 029. arXiv:hep-th/0006160. Bibcode:2000JHEP...08..029G. doi:10.1088/1126-6708/2000/08/029. S2CID 18641968.
37. Gomis, Jaume; Mehen, Thomas (2000). "Space-Time Noncommutative Field Theories and Unitarity". Nuclear Physics B. 591 (2000): 265–276. arXiv:hep-th/0005129. Bibcode:2000NuPhB.591..265G. doi:10.1016/S0550-3213(00)00525-3. S2CID 16324738.
38. Gomis, Jaume; Kleban, Matthew; Mehen, Thomas; Rangamani, Mukund; Shenker, Stephen (2000). "Noncommutative Gauge Dynamics from the String Worldsheet". Journal of High Energy Physics. 2000 (8): 011. arXiv:hep-th/0003215. Bibcode:2000JHEP...08..011G. doi:10.1088/1126-6708/2000/08/011. S2CID 15884143.
39. Fleming, Sean; Mehen, Thomas; Stewart, Iain W. (2000). "NNLO Corrections to Nucleon-Nucleon Scattering and Perturbative Pions". Nuclear Physics A. 677 (1–4): 313–366. arXiv:nucl-th/9911001. Bibcode:2000NuPhA.677..313F. doi:10.1016/S0375-9474(00)00221-9. S2CID 8431452.
40. Mehen, Thomas; Stewart, Iain W.; Wise, Mark B. (2000). "Conformal Invariance for Non-Relativistic Field Theory". Physics Letters B. 474 (1–2): 145–152. arXiv:hep-th/9910025. Bibcode:2000PhLB..474..145M. doi:10.1016/S0370-2693(00)00006-X. S2CID 15076895.
41. Fleming, Sean; Mehen, Thomas; Stewart, Iain W. (1999). "The NN scattering 3S1-3D1 mixing angle at NNLO". Physical Review C. 61 (4) 044005. arXiv:nucl-th/9906056. Bibcode:2000PhRvC..61d4005F. doi:10.1103/PhysRevC.61.044005.
42. Mehen, Thomas; Stewart, Iain W. (1999). "Nonrelativistic conformal field theory and trapped atoms: Virial theorems and the state-operator correspondence in three dimensions". Physical Review A. 78 (1) 013614. arXiv:nucl-th/9906010. Bibcode:2008PhRvA..78a3614M. doi:10.1103/PhysRevA.78.013614.
43. Mehen, Thomas; Stewart, Iain W.; Wise, Mark B. (1999). "Wigner symmetry in the limit of large scattering lengths". Physical Review Letters. 83 (5): 931–934. arXiv:hep-ph/9902370. Bibcode:1999PhRvL..83..931M. doi:10.1103/PhysRevLett.83.931. S2CID 32242436.
44. Mehen, Thomas; Stewart, Iain W. (1999). "Radiation pions in two-nucleon effective field theory". Nuclear Physics A. 665 (2000): 164–182. arXiv:nucl-th/9901064. Bibcode:2000NuPhA.665..164M. doi:10.1016/S0375-9474(99)00368-1. S2CID 14319669.
45. Leptoproduction of J / psi. Thomas Mehen. CALT-68-2198, Jul 1998. 5pp. Talk given at 29th International Conference on High-Energy Physics (ICHEP 98), Vancouver, Canada, 23-29 Jul 1998. In *Vancouver 1998, High energy physics, vol. 2* 1074–1078.
46. Mehen, Tom; Stewart, Iain W. (1999). "Renormalization schemes and the range of two-nucleon effective field theory". Physical Review C. 59 (5): 2365. arXiv:nucl-th/9809095. Bibcode:1999PhRvC..59.2365M. doi:10.1103/PhysRevC.59.2365. S2CID 12636669.
47. Mehen, Thomas; Stewart, Iain W. (1998). "A momentum subtraction scheme for two--nucleon effective field theory". Physics Letters B. 445 (3–4): 378–386. arXiv:nucl-th/9809071. Bibcode:1999PhLB..445..378M. doi:10.1016/S0370-2693(98)01470-1. S2CID 14665438.
48. Mehen, Thomas Carlos (1998). Phenomenology of heavy quarks and quarkonium (Thesis). ProQuest 304419830.
49. Fleming, Sean; Mehen, Thomas (1998). "Photoproduction of h_c". Physical Review D. 58 (3) 037503. arXiv:hep-ph/9801328. Bibcode:1998PhRvD..58c7503F. doi:10.1103/PhysRevD.58.037503.
50. Mehen, Thomas (1997). "Summing O(β_{0}^{n} α_{s}^{n+1}) Corrections to Top Quark Decays". Physics Letters B. 417 (3–4): 353–360. arXiv:hep-ph/9707403. Bibcode:1998PhLB..417..353M. doi:10.1016/S0370-2693(97)01348-8. S2CID 117950271.
51. Fleming, Sean; Mehen, Thomas (1997). "Leptoproduction of J/psi". Physical Review D. 57 (3): 1846–1857. arXiv:hep-ph/9707365. Bibcode:1998PhRvD..57.1846F. doi:10.1103/PhysRevD.57.1846. S2CID 918605.
52. Mehen, Thomas (1997). "Testing Quarkonium Production with Photoproduced J/ψ + γ". Physical Review D. 55 (7): 4338–4343. arXiv:hep-ph/9611321. Bibcode:1997PhRvD..55.4338M. doi:10.1103/PhysRevD.55.4338. S2CID 115769540.
53. Mehen, Thomas (1996). "Scale Setting in Top Quark Decays". Physics Letters B. 382 (3): 267–272. arXiv:hep-ph/9602410. Bibcode:1996PhLB..382..267M. doi:10.1016/0370-2693(96)00681-8. S2CID 17267975.
54. Falk, Adam F.; Mehen, Thomas (1995). "Excited Heavy Mesons Beyond Leading Order in the Heavy Quark Expansion". Physical Review D. 53 (1996): 231–240. arXiv:hep-ph/9507311. Bibcode:1996PhRvD..53..231F. doi:10.1103/PhysRevD.53.231. PMID 10019786. S2CID 5548289.
