= Academia Nacional de Ciencias (Costa Rica) =

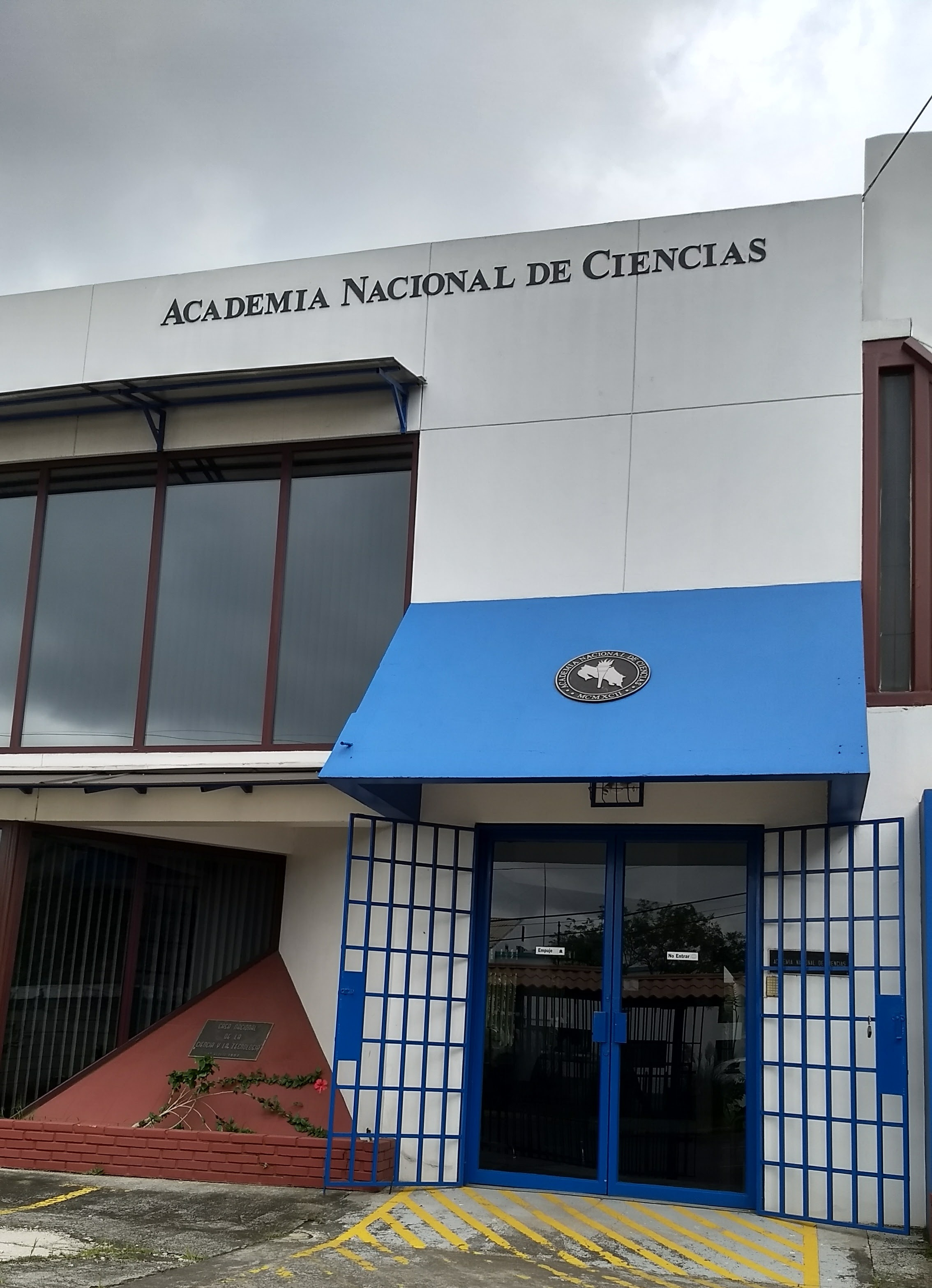
- Established: 26 June 1992
- President: Walter Fernández Rojas
- Executive Director: Dayana Mora Solórzano
- Address: Apto. 1367-2050, San Pedro, Costa Rica
- Website: www.anc.cr

The Academia Nacional de Ciencias (ANC, English: National Academy of Sciences) is Costa Rica's Academy of Sciences. It was created as a “permanent forum for discussion and scientific analysis,” and serves both as an honorific society and a source of scientific advice for the government. Its mandate is to promote scientific culture and progress within Costa Rica, and collaboration between national and international agencies. It maintains membership in international organizations such as the International Council for Science (ICSU), the InterAmerican Network of Academies of Sciences (IANAS) and the Third World Network (TWN). Its headquarters are in San Pedro in the province of San José.

== Mission ==
The ANC has several key missions:

1. Promoting the distribution of scientific knowledge within the general public—for example, holding monthly conferences for Costa Rican professors to present their work to anyone who wishes to attend.

2. Promoting careers in science—for example, sponsoring field trips for young people to visit places like the Ad Astra Rocket Company and the National Laboratory of Materials and Structural Models at the University of Costa Rica.

3. Maintaining connections with Costa Ricans working abroad. In part this is carried out through “La red TICOTAL,” an ANC program that maintains a network of Costa Rican researchers working domestically and internationally to promote opportunities for collaboration.

4. Serving as a scientific advisor to the Costa Rican government. When the government has a specific science-related question, the Academy reaches out to members who are experts on the topic and prepares a formal opinion. Recent topics have included the legalization of in vitro fertilization and the legalization of cannabis.

== History ==
With the creation of the University of Costa Rica in 1940 and the construction of the first research laboratories in the 1950s, Costa Ricans began the process of carrying out original and independent research within the country. In the 1980s, as the research community was becoming more established, a sense of restlessness was present among researchers to create a central forum for the exchange of ideas and scientific discussions. The creation of the Ministry of Science and Technology in 1986 further fed this restlessness, and in 1990, Law 7169 was passed, "Law for the Promotion of Scientific and Technological Development". In Article 66 of this law, it was established that "with the resources created in this law, the es:Consejo Nacional para Investigaciones Científicas y Tecnológicas (CONICIT) and the Ministry of Science and Technology will both promote the establishment and contribute to the development... of a National Academy of Sciences." The ANC was created with 26 founding members on June 26, 1992, via an executive order. In 1994, the ANC was presented with its official headquarters in San Pedro, a building called the "National House of Science and Technology". The legislative assembly confirmed the existence of the academy in 1995 via "Law 7544, Creation of the National Academy of Sciences".

== Members ==
New members of the ANC are elected by current members, based on their distinguished achievements in original research. This is measured through metrics such as journal publications in prestigious journals and willingness to explore new frontiers of research.

Some distinguished members include Franklin Chang-Diaz, an astronaut who currently is developing plasma rocket propulsion technology for NASA, Sandra Cauffman, Deputy Director of the Earth Sciences Division within the Science Mission Directorate at NASA, Giselle Tamayo, the first female president of CONICIT, and Marino Protti, a seismologist famous for helping predict earthquakes in the Nicoya Peninsula.

== Presidents ==
- 1992–1994: Dr. Bornemisza Elemér
- 1995–1998: Dr. Eugenia Flores
- 1998–2006: Dr. Walter Fernández
- 2006–2014: Dr. Gabriel Macaya Trejos
- 2015–2018: Dr. Pedro León Azofeifa
- 2018–present: Dr. Walter Fernández
