= Fred Gilman =

American physicist

Frederick J. Gilman
- Born: October 9, 1940 (age 85); Lansing, MI
- Education: Princeton (PhD, 1965); Michigan State University (BS, 1962)
- Scientific career
- Fields: Theoretical physics
- Workplaces: Carnegie Mellon University (1995-); Superconducting Super Collider (1990-1995); Stanford University (1967-1990); Caltech (1965-1967); Caltech (visiting professor); FermiLab (visiting professor); Institute for Advanced Study (visiting professor); Rockefeller University (visiting professor); Weizmann Institute (visiting professor)
- Doctoral advisor: Marvin Goldberger
- Other academic advisors: Murray Gell-Mann
- Doctoral students: Mary Hall Reno; Mark B. Wise

Frederick Joseph Gilman is an American physicist and the Buhl Professor of Theoretical Physics Emeritus at Carnegie Mellon University.

== Early life and education ==
Gilman was born on October 9, 1940. He grew up in East Lansing, Michigan and received his B.S. in physics from Michigan State University in 1962, shaped by undergraduate research experiences in particle physics and bacteriophage genetics. He was a member of the three-person team that placed first in the December 1961 William Lowell Putnam Mathematical Competition for undergraduates in the United States and Canada.

He received his PhD from Princeton University in 1965 with Marvin Leonard Goldberger as his thesis advisor, and then became an NSF postdoctoral fellow with Murray Gell-Mann at Caltech. Gilman’s early research was on developing and testing the validity of sum rules for weak, electromagnetic, and strong processes based on quarks being fundamental constituents of matter.

== Career ==
In 1967, he transitioned to being a postdoctoral fellow at SLAC. Gilman became an associate professor at Stanford University in 1969 and a professor in 1973. His research over the next four decades covered particle physics phenomena broadly but was especially on understanding the effects of strong interactions on electromagnetic and weak processes. Prime examples are the application of duality ideas from strong interactions to the scattering of electrons on protons and neutrons in the early 1970s, and his work a decade later with Mark Wise to systematically examine matter-antimatter asymmetries and their experimental consequences for masses and rare decays of K mesons.

Much of his research in the 1980s was on heavy quark systems, especially those involving charm and bottom quarks, and on matter-antimatter asymmetries, helping to inspire experiments at both electron and hadron accelerators that verified the standard model in the decades that followed. In 1985, Gilman was elected a Fellow of the American Physical Society (APS) “for highly original and timely contributions to the phenomenology of elementary particle reactions, especially for his creative interplay with the experimental program at SLAC, including the elucidation of scaling behavior in deeply inelastic scattering.”

Through the 1980s, he also participated in multiple studies leading to the Superconducting Super Collider (SSC) project. Elected to be the chair of the Division of Particles and Fields of APS, he led the community’s 1988 Snowmass Summer Study on the SSC. In January 1990, Gilman left SLAC to head the Physics Research Division of the SSC project, with responsibility for the creation of the SSC experimental program as well as building up the internal computing, facilities, experimental, and theoretical groups. The project was cancelled in October 1993 as the two major SSC detectors were starting construction, and he spent the next two years archiving and transferring the knowledge and technology gained from the project.

Following the SSC, Gilman became Buhl Professor of Theoretical Physics at Carnegie Mellon University. While initially focused on teaching undergraduates and research, he became head of the department of physics in 1999, leading to initiatives in biological physics, cosmology (as founding director of the McWilliams Center for Cosmology), and quantum electronics. From 2007 to 2016, he was dean of the Mellon College of Science (MCS). The Gilman Award is given each year to graduating MCS science students who have demonstrated exceptional commitment and growth through the revised MCS core education that he was deeply engaged in developing and implementing in 2015 as dean.

Outside of Carnegie Mellon, Gilman chaired a High Energy Physics Advisory Panel (HEPAP) subpanel in 1997-1998 to make a plan for U.S. high energy physics post-SSC. Afterwards, he became chair of HEPAP itself for 6 years. As Carnegie Mellon became involved with the Large Synoptic Survey Telescope (LSST), now the Vera C. Rubin Observatory, Gilman joined in helping to advance the project, and then chaired the committee overseeing its construction from 2012 to 2018. He currently serves as a member of the management board for telescope operations. He became a Fellow of the American Association for the Advancement of Science in 2019 “for his work elucidating the fundamental nature of CP violation, and his sustained and successful leadership in the particle physics and cosmology communities.”
