= Mary Hall Reno =

American physicist

Mary Hall "Hallsie" Reno is an American theoretical particle physicist whose research focuses on neutrinos, neutrino interactions with nucleons, and neutrino detection. She is Erich Funke Professor of Physics at the University of Iowa.

== Education and career ==
Reno is one of four children of a lawyer from Baltimore. She began her undergraduate studies in physics at Reed College; after two years there she transferred to Haverford College, but a year later transferred back again and graduated from Reed in 1980. She completed her Ph.D. in physics at Stanford University, supervised by Fred Gilman and Savas Dimopoulos, in 1985.

After postdoctoral research at Fermilab and a visiting position at the Centro de Investigación y de Estudios Avanzados in Mexico, she joined the University of Iowa as an assistant professor in 1990. She was promoted to associate professor in 1995 and full professor in 2002. She chaired the Department of Physics & Astronomy from 2009 to 2014, and was given the Erich Funke Professorship in 2021.

== Recognition ==
Reno was named as a Fellow of the American Physical Society (APS) in 2010, after a nomination from the APS Division of Particles and Fields, "for important contributions to the physics of neutrino interactions and detection, especially at high energies".

The University of Iowa named her as a Dean's Fellow in 2000, a Faculty Scholar in 2003, and a College of Liberal Arts and Sciences Collegiate Fellow in 2019.

== Personal life ==
Reno is married to Yannick Meurice, a Belgian physicist who is also a professor of physics at the University of Iowa. They met at a seminar in the French Alps while she was a postdoctoral researcher. They have three daughters; a fourth daughter died as a child in an automobile accident.
