= Gail McLaughlin =

American astrophysicist

Gail Catherine McLaughlin
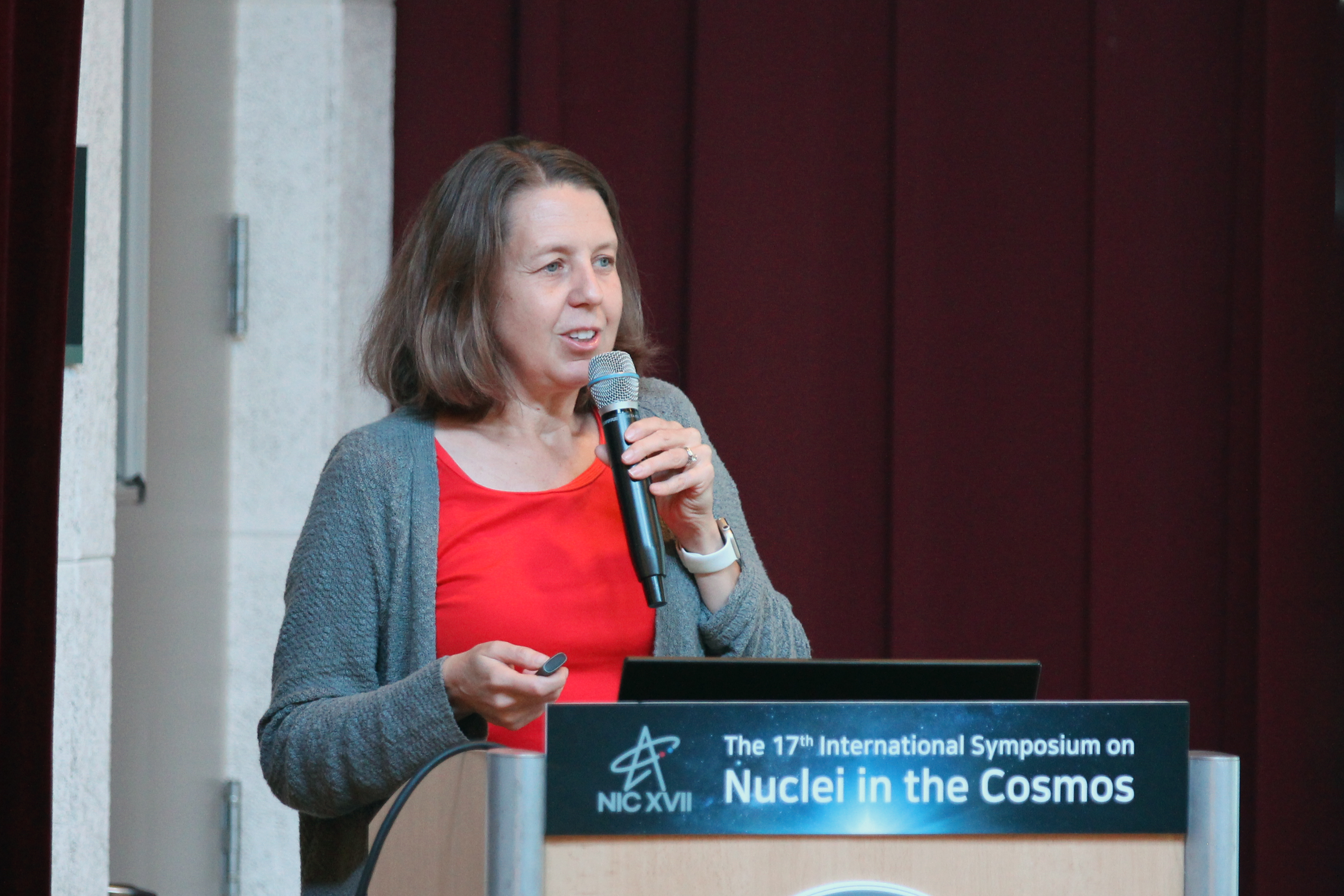
- Education: University of California, San Diego, Princeton University
- Scientific career
- Fields: Nuclear astrophysics
- Workplaces: North Carolina State University, Stony Brook University
- Thesis: Physics of Massive Stars and Supernovae: Weak Interactions and Stability Analysis (1996)
- Academic advisors: George M. Fuller

Gail Catherine McLaughlin is an American nuclear astrophysicist specializing in astrophysical neutrinos and the r-process for nucleosynthesis. She is Distinguished University Professor of Physics at North Carolina State University.

== Education and career ==
McLaughlin majored in physics at Princeton University, graduating in 1991. She completed her Ph.D. in physics in 1996, at the University of California, San Diego. Her dissertation, Physics of Massive Stars and Supernovae: Weak Interactions and Stability Analysis, was supervised by George M. Fuller.

After postdoctoral research at the University of Washington and TRIUMF, she became a research scientist at Stony Brook University before moving to North Carolina State University in 2001. She was named Distinguished University Professor in 2017.

== Recognition ==
McLaughlin was named a Fellow of the American Physical Society (APS) in 2009, after a nomination from the APS Division of Nuclear Physics, "for her work in elucidating the role of neutrinos in nucleosynthesis in supernovae and black hole accretion disks, and for her studies of the potential of low energy beta-beams in neutrino physics".

In 2023 McLaughlin was named winner of 2024's Herman Feshbach Prize. "For seminal contributions to the study of neutrinos in explosive systems and for elucidating the profound impact of this microphysics on the synthesis of elements."
