= Walter D. Goldberger =

American theoretical physicist

- Education: California Institute of Technology (PhD, 2001)
- Known for: Goldberger–Wise mechanism Effective field theory for compact binary dynamics (NRGR)
- Awards: DOE Outstanding Junior Investigator Award
- Scientific career
- Fields: Theoretical physics Particle physics Gravitational wave theory
- Workplaces: Yale University
- Doctoral advisor: Mark B. Wise

Walter D. Goldberger is an American theoretical physicist and Professor of Physics at Yale University. His research spans particle physics theory, quantum field theory, and gravitational physics. He is known for the Goldberger–Wise mechanism, which stabilizes extra dimensions in braneworld models, and for developing, with Ira Rothstein, an effective field theory (EFT) framework for gravitational wave emission from compact binaries, known as NRGR (non-relativistic general relativity).

== Education and career ==
Goldberger received his Ph.D. in physics from the California Institute of Technology in 2001, where his doctoral advisor was Mark B. Wise. His doctoral work on extra dimensions and the Randall–Sundrum model led to the Goldberger–Wise mechanism.

Following postdoctoral research, he joined the faculty at Yale University, where he serves as a Professor of Physics in the Particle Theory Group. He received an Outstanding Junior Investigator award from the U.S. Department of Energy for his proposal "Investigations in the Field Theories: From Gravity to the Electroweak Scale".

== Research ==
Goldberger's research applies techniques from quantum field theory to problems in particle physics phenomenology and classical general relativity.

=== Goldberger–Wise mechanism ===
In 1999, Goldberger and Wise proposed a mechanism to stabilize the size of the extra dimension in the Randall–Sundrum (RS1) braneworld model. In the RS1 framework, the hierarchy problem is addressed via a warped five-dimensional geometry with the metric

$$ds^2 = e^{-2k|y|} \eta_{\mu\nu} dx^\mu dx^\nu + dy^2,$$

where $k$ is the AdS curvature scale and $y$ is the coordinate of the fifth dimension. For the model to explain the hierarchy between the electroweak scale and the Planck scale, the distance between the two branes—parameterized by the radion field—must be stabilized at a specific value.

The Goldberger–Wise mechanism introduces a bulk scalar field $\Phi$ with potentials localized on the Planck and TeV branes. The competing boundary conditions force $\Phi$ to develop a non-trivial vacuum expectation value profile across the bulk. Integrating over the extra dimension generates an effective four-dimensional potential for the radion that possesses a stable minimum, yielding a compactification scale that solves the hierarchy problem without fine-tuning of parameters. The mechanism has become a standard approach to modulus stabilization in theories with compactified extra dimensions and has been connected to flux stabilization in string theory compactifications.

=== Effective field theory for compact binary dynamics (NRGR) ===
In 2004–2006, Goldberger and Ira Rothstein introduced an effective field theory framework for the gravitational dynamics of non-relativistic extended objects, referred to as NRGR. The approach, inspired by methods from non-relativistic QCD (NRQCD) used to describe heavy quark bound states, provides a systematic framework for computing gravitational wave observables from compact binary inspirals, the primary signal sources for detectors such as LIGO and Virgo.

Instead of solving the full non-linear Einstein field equations, the method treats compact objects (black holes or neutron stars) as point particles moving along worldlines, with their finite size encoded in higher-dimension operators in a worldline action. The effective action takes the form

$$S_{\text{pp}} = -m \int d\tau - \int d\tau \left[ c_E \, E_{\mu\nu} E^{\mu\nu} + c_B \, B_{\mu\nu} B^{\mu\nu} + \cdots \right],$$

where $E_{\mu\nu}$ and $B_{\mu\nu}$ are the electric and magnetic components of the Weyl tensor evaluated on the worldline, and $c_E, c_B$ are Wilson coefficients encoding the internal structure (such as tidal deformability) of the compact object. This formalism separates three scales in the problem—the gravitational radius of the compact objects, their orbital separation, and the wavelength of the emitted radiation—and organizes the post-Newtonian expansion using Feynman diagrams and renormalization group methods from quantum field theory.

Goldberger and Rothstein also developed an EFT description of dissipative effects in black hole dynamics, modeling the horizon as a boundary carrying localized degrees of freedom that absorb and re-emit gravitational radiation.

With Andreas Ross, Goldberger extended the EFT to describe long-wavelength gravitational radiation, demonstrating the renormalization of multipole moments and the cancellation of infrared divergences in gravitational wave observables at 3PN order.

=== Classical double copy ===
Goldberger has contributed to establishing a classical analogue of the Bern–Carrasco–Johansson (BCJ) double copy, a correspondence between perturbative solutions in Yang–Mills theory and general relativity. With Alexander Ridgway, he showed that classical gravitational bremsstrahlung can be obtained from Yang–Mills radiation via color-to-kinematic replacement rules. This was extended to spinning sources with Jingping Li and Siddharth Prabhu, who showed that graviton and dilaton radiation amplitudes in the gravitational theory precisely match the predictions of the double copy.

=== Effective field theory for quantum black hole horizons ===
In 2020, Goldberger and Rothstein developed an effective theory for black holes with quantum mechanical horizons, valid at scales long compared to the Schwarzschild radius but short compared to the black hole lifetime. The formalism allows calculation of quantum effects in scattering processes involving black hole asymptotic states. They showed that EFT Wightman functions describing Hawking radiation in the Unruh vacuum are not Planck-suppressed and are enhanced relative to those in the Boulware vacuum, but that these non-Planck-suppressed effects cancel in classical observables.

== Selected publications ==
- Goldberger, Walter D.; Wise, Mark B. (1999). "Modulus Stabilization with Bulk Fields". Physical Review Letters. 83: 4922–4925. arXiv:hep-ph/9907447. doi:10.1103/PhysRevLett.83.4922.
- Goldberger, Walter D.; Rothstein, Ira Z. (2006). "An effective field theory of gravity for extended objects". Physical Review D. 73 104029. arXiv:hep-th/0409156. doi:10.1103/PhysRevD.73.104029.
- Goldberger, Walter D.; Ross, Andreas (2010). "Gravitational radiative corrections from effective field theory". Physical Review D. 81 124015. arXiv:0912.4254. doi:10.1103/PhysRevD.81.124015.
- Goldberger, Walter D. (2007). "Les Houches Lectures on Effective Field Theories and Gravitational Radiation". arXiv:hep-ph/0701129.
- Goldberger, Walter D. (2022). "Effective Field Theory for Compact Binary Dynamics". arXiv:2212.06677 [hep-th].
