= Xiangdong Ji =

Chinese theoretical nuclear and particle physicist

- Born: 1962 (age 63–64)
- Education: Tongji University; Drexel University
- Awards: Humboldt Prize (2014); Outstanding Nuclear Physicists Award (2015); Herman Feshbach Prize in Theoretical Nuclear Physics (2016)
- Scientific career
- Fields: Nuclear physics, particle physics
- Workplaces: California Institute of Technology; Massachusetts Institute of Technology; University of Maryland; Shanghai Jiao Tong University; Peking University

Xiangdong Ji (Chinese: 季向东; pinyin: Jì Xiàngdōng; born 1962) is a Chinese theoretical nuclear and elementary particle physicist. He is a Distinguished University Professor at the University of Maryland, College Park.

Ji received his bachelor's degree from Tongji University in 1982 and his PhD from Drexel University in 1987. He was a postdoctoral researcher at Caltech and MIT. In 1991, he became Assistant Professor at the MIT, and in 1996 he moved to the University of Maryland, where he was the founding director of the Maryland Center for Fundamental Physics from 2007 to 2009. He was the Dean of Physics and Astronomy Department at Shanghai Jiao Tong University from 2009 to 2013.

Ji's main research interest has been in the quark and gluon structure of the proton and neutron in Quantum Chromodynamics (QCD). He formulated the spin structure of the proton in terms of local and gauge-invariant spin and orbital angular momentum contributions of quarks and gluons (Ji spin decomposition), showed that they can be obtained (Ji sum rule) from a class of physical quantities called Generalized Parton Distributions (GPDs) he introduced independently. GPDs are the special cases of Wigner distributions which provide simultaneous space and momentum information of partons.

Ji found a new class of QCD hard scattering called Deep Exclusive Processes in lepton-nucleon collisions, which allows to probe the GPDs experimentally. The simplest example is production of a high-energy photon and a recoil nucleon in hard scattering, which he named it as Deeply-Virtual Compton scattering (DVCS). Deep Exclusive Processes has been an important part of the experimental program at Jefferson Lab 12 GeV facility and the Electron-Ion Collider at Brookhaven National Laboratory.

In 2013, Ji found that the fundamental quantities charactering the high-energy properties of the nucleon, the parton distributions introduced by R. Feynman, can be directly calculated in Euclidean lattice field theory. He developed this into Large-Momentum Effective Theory or LaMET which allows parton physics or light-cone correlations computable from large momentum expansion of time-independent observables in lattice QCD.

Ji was elected a fellow of the American Physical Society in 2000, "[f]or fundamental contributions to the understanding of the structure of the nucleon and the process of deeply virtual Compton scattering." In 2014 he won the Humboldt Prize and in 2015 he won the Outstanding Nuclear Physicists Award from the Jefferson Sciences Associates.

In 2016 he won the Herman Feshbach Prize in Theoretical Nuclear Physics for pioneering work in developing tools to characterize the structure of the nucleon within QCD and for showing how its properties can be probed through experiments; this work not only illuminates the nucleon theoretically but also acts as a driver of experimental programs worldwide.

Ji is also engaged in elementary particle physics. He was the founder and the first spokesperson (2009-2018) of the PandaX project, one of the three most advanced deep underground liquid xenon experiments in the world (the other two are XENON and LZ), to elucidate the nature of dark matter and fundamental properties of neutrinos.
