= Heavy quark effective theory =

Effective field theory describing the physics of heavy quarks

In quantum chromodynamics, heavy quark effective theory (HQET) is an effective field theory describing the physics of heavy (that is, of mass far greater than the QCD scale) quarks. It is used in studying the properties of hadrons containing a single charm or bottom quark. The effective theory was formalised in 1990 by Howard Georgi, Estia Eichten and Christopher Hill, building upon the works of Nathan Isgur and Mark Wise, Mikhail Voloshin and Mikhail Shifman, and others.

Quantum chromodynamics (QCD) is the theory of strong force, through which quarks and gluons interact. HQET is the limit of QCD with the quark mass taken to infinity while its four-velocity is held fixed. This approximation enables non-perturbative (in the strong interaction coupling) treatment of quarks that are much heavier than the QCD mass scale. The mass scale is of order 200 MeV. Hence the heavy quarks include charm, bottom and top quarks, whereas up, down and strange quarks are considered light. Since the top quark is extremely short-lived, only the charm and bottom quarks are of significant interest to HQET, of which only the latter has mass sufficiently high that the effective theory can be applied without major perturbative corrections.
