= Andrew Childs =

American computer scientist and physicist

Andrew MacGregor Childs
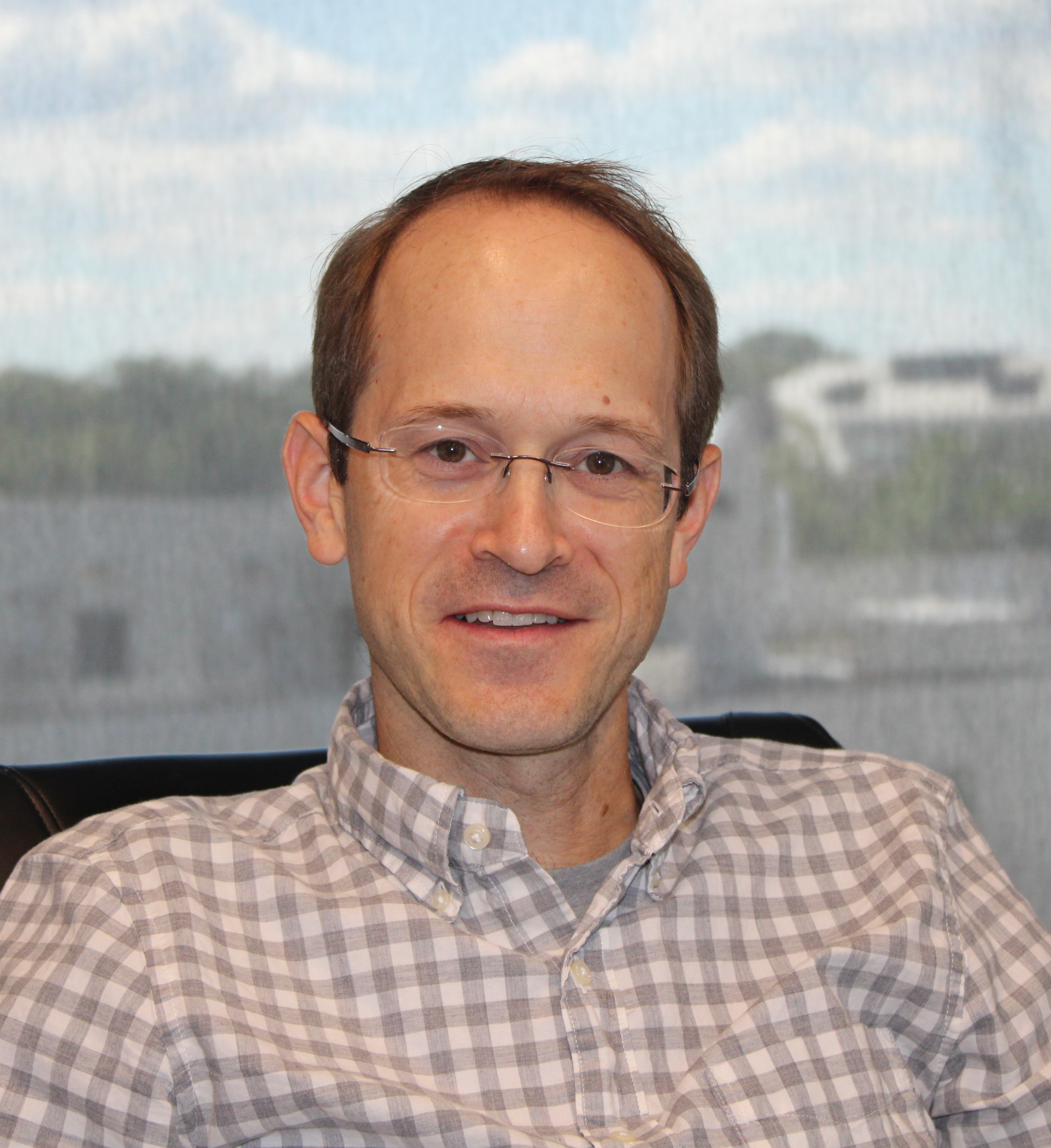
- Education: California Institute of Technology; Massachusetts Institute of Technology
- Known for: Quantum computing, quantum algorithms, quantum walk
- Scientific career
- Fields: Computer science, physics
- Workplaces: University of Maryland; University of Waterloo
- Doctoral advisor: Edward Farhi
- Website: www.cs.umd.edu/~amchilds

Andrew MacGregor Childs is an American computer scientist and physicist known for his work on quantum computing. He is currently a professor in the department of computer science and Institute for Advanced Computer Studies at the University of Maryland. He also co-directs the Joint Center for Quantum Information and Computer Science, a partnership between the University of Maryland and the National Institute of Standards and Technology.

== Biography ==
Andrew Childs received a doctorate in physics from MIT in 2004, advised by Edward Farhi. His thesis was on Quantum Information Processing in Continuous Time. After completing his Ph.D., Childs was a DuBridge Postdoctoral Scholar at the Institute for Quantum Information at the California Institute of Technology from 2004 to 2007. From 2007 to 2014, he was a faculty member in the Department of Combinatorics and Optimization and the Institute for Quantum Computing at the University of Waterloo. Childs joined the University of Maryland in 2014. He is also a senior fellow of the Canadian Institute for Advanced Research.

== Research ==
Childs is known for his work on quantum computing, especially on the development of quantum algorithms. He helped to develop the concept of a quantum walk leading to an example of exponential quantum speedup and algorithms for spatial search, formula evaluation, and universal computation. He also developed quantum algorithms for algebraic problems and for simulating quantum systems.

== Selected works ==
- A. M. Childs; R. Cleve; E. Deotto; E. Farhi; S. Gutmann & D. A. Spielman (2003). "Exponential algorithmic speedup by a quantum walk". Proceedings of the thirty-fifth annual ACM symposium on Theory of computing. Vol. 35. pp. 59–68. arXiv:quant-ph/0209131. doi:10.1145/780542.780552. ISBN 1-58113-674-9. S2CID 308884.
- Childs, Andrew M. (2009). "Universal computation by quantum walk". Physical Review Letters. 102 (18) 180501. arXiv:0806.1972. Bibcode:2009PhRvL.102r0501C. doi:10.1103/PhysRevLett.102.180501. PMID 19518851. S2CID 21293797.
- Childs, Andrew M.; Farhi, Edward; Preskill, John (2001). "Robustness of adiabatic quantum computation". Physical Review A. 65 (2002) 012322. arXiv:quant-ph/0108048. Bibcode:2001PhRvA..65a2322C. doi:10.1103/PhysRevA.65.012322. S2CID 6476505.
- Ambainis, Andris; Childs, Andrew M.; Reichardt, Ben W.; Spalek, Robert; Zhang, Shengyu (2007). "Any AND-OR Formula of Size N can be Evaluated in time N^{1/2 + o(1)} on a Quantum Computer". 48th Annual IEEE Symposium on Foundations of Computer Science (FOCS'07). pp. 2513–2530. doi:10.1109/FOCS.2007.57. ISBN 978-0-7695-3010-9. S2CID 7831233.
- Childs, Andrew M.; Gosset, David; Webb, Zak (2013). "Universal computation by multi-particle quantum walk". Science. 339 (6121): 791–794. arXiv:1205.3782. Bibcode:2013Sci...339..791C. doi:10.1126/science.1229957. PMID 23413349. S2CID 6727005.
- Berry, Dominic W.; Childs, Andrew M.; Cleve, Richard; Kothari, Robin; Somma, Rolando D. (2013). "Exponential improvement in precision for simulating sparse Hamiltonians". Proceedings of the 46th Annual ACM Symposium on Theory of Computing – STOC '14. Vol. 46. pp. 283–292. arXiv:1312.1414. doi:10.1145/2591796.2591854. ISBN 978-1-4503-2710-7. S2CID 382473.
- Childs, Andrew M. (2010). "On the relationship between continuous- and discrete-time quantum walk". Communications in Mathematical Physics. 294 (2): 581–603. arXiv:0810.0312. Bibcode:2010CMaPh.294..581C. doi:10.1007/s00220-009-0930-1. S2CID 14801066.
