= Iain Stewart (physicist) =

Canadian-American theoretical nuclear and particle physicist

- Citizenship: American, Canadian
- Education: University of Manitoba (BSc 1994, MSc 1995); California Institute of Technology (PhD 1999)
- Known for: Effective field theory Soft-collinear effective theory
- Awards: APS Fellow; Simons Investigator
- Scientific career
- Fields: Nuclear physics Particle physics
- Workplaces: University of California, San Diego; University of Washington, Seattle; Massachusetts Institute of Technology
- Thesis: Applications of Chiral Perturbation Theory in Reactions with Heavy Particles (1999)
- Academic advisors: Peter Blunden (MSc); Mark Wise (PhD)

Iain William Stewart is a Canadian-American theoretical nuclear and particle physicist at the Massachusetts Institute of Technology, where he is the Otto and Jane Morningstar Professor of Science and the current Director of the MIT Center for Theoretical Physics (CTP). He is best known for his work on effective field theories and for developing the Soft Collinear Effective Theory (SCET).

== Biography ==
Stewart attended college at the University of Manitoba, where he received his B.Sc. with Joint Honors in Physics and Mathematics and M.Sc. in Theoretical Physics in 1994 and 1995, respectively, and won the Governor General’s Silver Medal for highest standing in his graduating class. He wrote his master’s thesis under the supervision of Peter Blunden.

Stewart then moved to the California Institute of Technology for four years, earning his Ph.D. in Theoretical Physics in 1999 under the supervision of Mark Wise. He then held a postdoctoral position at the University of California, San Diego until 2002 and a research assistant professorship at the University of Washington, Seattle for a year, before moving to the MIT Department of Physics in 2003, where he earned tenure in 2009. He became director of the MIT Center for Theoretical Physics in 2019 and was promoted to a named professorship in 2021.

== Research and teaching ==
Stewart “designs and applies effective field theories to describe physics at collider experiments and to explore the structure of quantum field theory.” Effective field theory is a technique used to circumvent the difficulty of carrying out calculations and approximations related to elementary particle physics, when the calculations involves working with quantities of vastly different magnitudes. Stewart is perhaps best known for developing the Soft Collinear Effective Theory (SCET) in the early 2000’s, which helps physicists analyze interactions between energetic quarks and gluons that are soft (low energy) or collinear (traveling in a similar direction).

He has also made major contributions to other areas of theoretical nuclear and particle physics, including the use of Euclidean distributions in lattice QCD, the use of SCET in collider physics and B physics, non-relativistic QED and QCD, and indirect detection methods for dark matter.

In addition to his research, Stewart engages in teaching and mentoring activities. He has supervised dozens of undergraduates, graduate students, and postdoctoral fellows, many of whom have gone on to faculty positions at universities and national labs. He developed a free online course on Effective Field Theory through the platform EdX, as well as a new MIT course, Classical Mechanics III. MIT awarded him the Buechner Faculty Teaching Award, the Committed to Caring Award, and the Perkins Award for Excellence in Graduate Advising.

== Honors ==
- MIT Perkins Award for Excellence in Graduate Advising (2024)
- MIT Committed to Caring Award (2023)
- Erwin Schrodinger Visiting Professor, University of Vienna, City of Vienna (2016)
- MIT Buechner Faculty Teaching Award (2015)
- Simons Investigator of the Simons Foundation (2014)
- Fellow of the American Physical Society (2013)
- Friedrich Wilhelm Bessel Research Award from the Humboldt Foundation (2008)
- Sloan Fellowship (2004)
- Outstanding Junior Investigator Award, US Department of Energy (2003)
- Governor General's Silver Medal (1994)
