= Edward Farhi =

American physicist

- Born: Edward Henry Farhi; June 26, 1952 (age 74); New York, U.S.
- Education: Bronx Science; Brandeis University; Harvard University
- Scientific career
- Fields: Physics
- Workplaces: SLAC; CERN; MIT
- Doctoral advisor: Howard Georgi

Edward Henry Farhi (born June 26, 1952) is an American physicist who is currently a principal scientist at Google. Until 2018, he was the Cecil and Ida Green Professor of Physics at MIT, and from 2004 to 2016 he was the director of the MIT Center for Theoretical Physics. He worked on particle physics and general relativity before moving to quantum computing.

== Biography ==
Farhi attended the Bronx High School of Science and obtained a B.A. and M.A. in physics at Brandeis University before receiving a Ph.D. in 1978 from Harvard University advised by Howard Georgi. He was on the staff at the Stanford Linear Accelerator Center and at CERN in Geneva, Switzerland before joining MIT in 1982. From July 2004 to 2016, he was the Director of the MIT Center for Theoretical Physics.

== Work ==
As a graduate student, Farhi introduced the jet variable thrust. He later worked with Leonard Susskind on grand unified theories with electro-weak dynamical symmetry breaking and with Larry Abbott at CERN on models in which quarks, leptons, and massive gauge bosons are composite. He and Robert Jaffe formalized a notion of strange matter and with Charles Alcock and Angela Olinto he studied "strange stars," compact objects made of strange matter. Later, he and Alan Guth studied limitations on creating a new inflationary universe in a laboratory. He and Guth, along with Sean Carroll, gave limitations on the existence of Gott time machines in two spatial dimensions.

Since the late '90s, Farhi has worked on quantum computing and quantum algorithms. He and Sam Gutmann, who have known each other since high school, introduced a continuous-time Hamiltonian-based approach to quantum computation. and proposed the first algorithms based on quantum walks. Along with Jeffrey Goldstone and Michael Sipser, they introduced an early proposal for adiabatic quantum computation. In 2007, Farhi, Goldstone, and Gutmann gave a polynomial quantum speedup, using quantum walks, for solving a certain combinatorial game. In 2010, along with Peter Shor and three others at MIT, he introduced a scheme for quantum money. In 2014 Farhi, Goldstone, and Gutmann introduced the quantum approximate optimization algorithm (QAOA) for finding approximate solutions to combinatorial search problems, which as of 2024 was viewed as a leading candidate to run on contemporary noisy intermediate-scale quantum devices. Farhi and Aram Harrow have argued that the lowest depth version of the QAOA could exhibit a form of quantum supremacy.
