= Goldberger–Wise mechanism =

Proposed mechanism in particle physics

In particle physics, the Goldberger–Wise mechanism is a hypothetical mechanism that determines the size of the fifth dimension in Randall–Sundrum models. It was first developed by Walter D. Goldberger and Mark B. Wise in 1999. The mechanism uses a scalar field that propagates throughout the five-dimensional bulk. On each of the branes that end the fifth dimension (frequently referred to as the Planck brane and TeV brane, respectively) there is a potential for this scalar field. The minima for the potentials on the Planck brane and TeV brane are different and causes the vacuum expectation value of the scalar field to change throughout the fifth dimension. This configuration generates a potential for the radion causing it to have a vacuum expectation value and a mass. With reasonable values for the scalar potential, the size of the extra dimension is large enough to solve the hierarchy problem.
