= John W. Negele =

John William Negele (born 18 April 1944 in Cleveland, Ohio) is an American theoretical nuclear physicist.

Negele studied electrical engineering at Purdue University with a bachelor's degree in 1965. He received his PhD in theoretical physics from Cornell University in 1969, under the supervision of Hans Bethe, with the dissertation The Structure of Finite Nuclei in the Local Density Approximation. He was a postdoc at the Niels Bohr Institute of the University of Copenhagen. From 1970, he was at MIT, first as a visiting assistant professor, and then from 1979 as a professor (becoming, in 1991, "W.A. Coolidge Professor"). He was the director of the Center for Theoretical Physics at MIT from 1989 to 1998 and is the director of the Atomic Science Institute at MIT (Laboratory of Nuclear Science, LNS).

Negele's research deals with many-body theory in nuclear physics (including local density approximation, time-dependent Hartree-Fock (TDHF) methods, and path integral methods) and also with many-body theory in spin systems. He originated the first density functional theory of finite nuclei starting from realistic (experimentally justified) nucleon-nucleon interactions. In doing so, he and his colleagues calculated the binding energies of nuclei, single-particle excitation energies, charge distributions, and nuclear matter properties in neutron stars. Since the 1980s, he has dealt with lattice QCD. He was also involved in the design of special computer clusters for such calculations.

He was a Guggenheim Fellow for the academic year 1982–1983 and received the Humboldt Research Award. He was elected a Fellow of the American Physical Society (APS) in 1978 and a Fellow of the American Association for the Advancement of Science in 1987. In 2014, he received the Herman Feshbach Prize in Theoretical Nuclear Physics for "lifetime contributions to nuclear many-body theory including identifying mechanisms for saturation and relating the Skyrme interaction to fundamental nuclear forces; and for initiating and leading efforts to understand the nucleon using lattice QCD."

He served as the first chair of the APS committee Computational Physics.

== Selected publications ==
- Negele, J. W.; Orland, H. (1988). Quantum many-particle systems. Redwood City, CA: Adisson Wesley. ISBN 978-0805368055.
- Bertsch, G.; Mueller, B.; Negele, J.; Friar, J.; Pandharipande, V. (1995). "Nuclear Theory White Paper 1995". arXiv:nucl-th/9502035.
- Negele, J. W. (1998). "Understanding hadron structure using lattice QCD". In Molinari, A.; Ricci, R. A. (eds.). Unfolding the Matter of Nuclei. Proceedings of the International School of Physics "Enrico Fermi". Vol. 138. IOS Press. pp. 209–250. arXiv:hep-lat/9804017. ISBN 90-5199-465-6. LCCN 98-75485.
- Negele, J.W. (1999). "Instantons, the QCD vacuum, and hadronic physics". Nuclear Physics B: Proceedings Supplements. 73 (1–3): 92–104. arXiv:hep-lat/9810053. Bibcode:1999NuPhS..73...92N. doi:10.1016/S0920-5632(99)85010-5. S2CID 118981211.
- Negele, J.W. (2002). "Understanding hadron structure using lattice QCD". Nuclear Physics A. 699 (1–2): 18–25. arXiv:hep-lat/0107010. Bibcode:2002NuPhA.699...18N. doi:10.1016/S0375-9474(01)01465-8. S2CID 15118037.
