= Sandra Cauffman =

Costa Rican physicist and electrical engineer

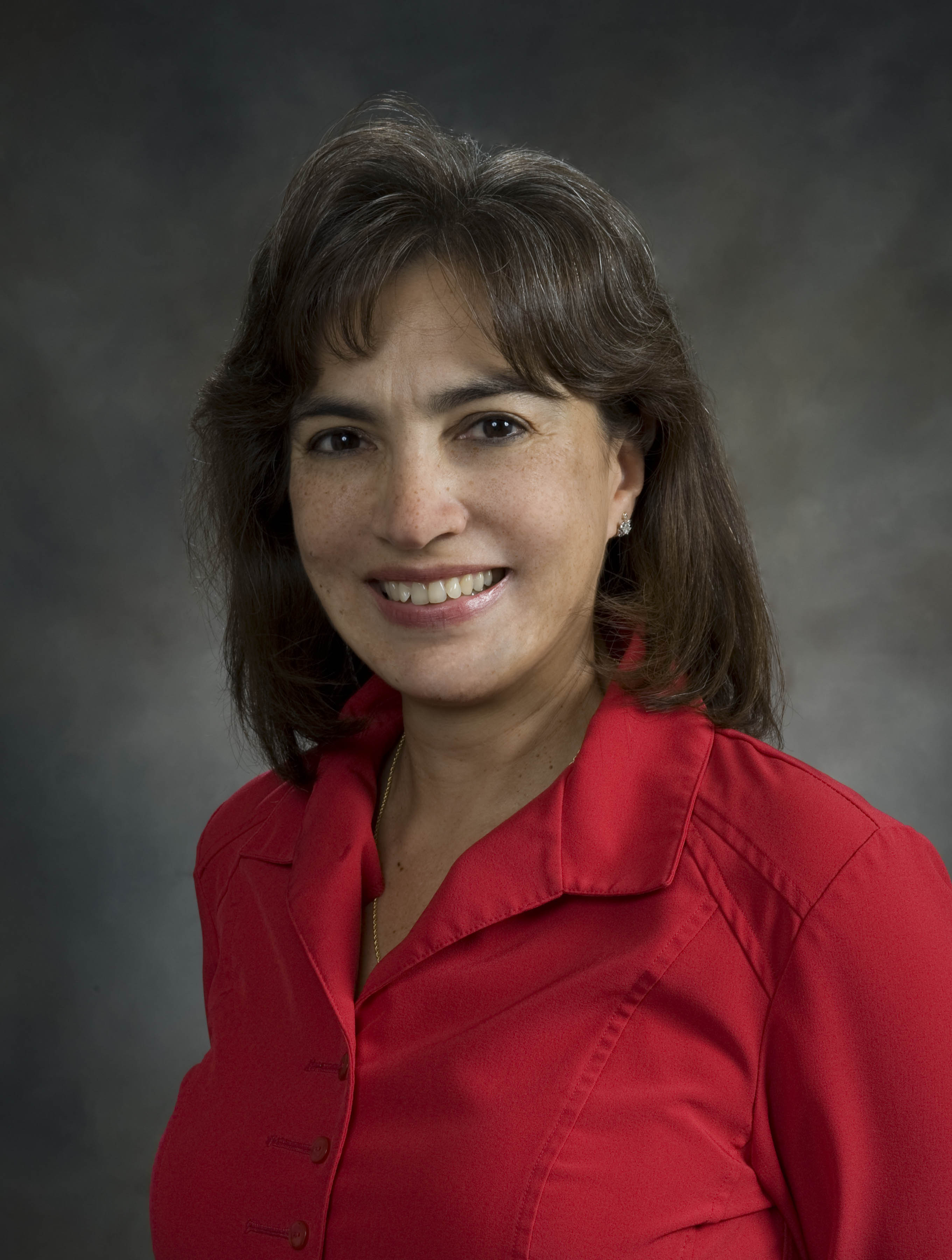
- Sandra Cauffman, Deputy Director, Astrophysics Division, Science Mission Directorate, NASA Headquarters
- Born: May 10, 1962 (age 64); San José, Costa Rica
- Education: University of Costa Rica; George Mason University (BS, BS, MS)
- Known for: MAVEN Deputy Project Manager; GOES-R Deputy Systems Program Director; Deputy Director of NASA's Astrophysics Division
- Awards: NASA Exceptional Achievement Medal; NASA Outstanding Leadership Medal (3-time recipient); Doctorate Honoris Causa, University of Costa Rica (2023)

Sandra Cauffman (born May 10, 1962) is a Costa Rican-American (born in Costa Rica) specialist in electrical engineering and physics. She is known for her work at NASA in different projects. Her profile has been highlighted by UN Women for being a positive example for women, especially, youth and children. Cauffman worked for 25 years at the NASA Goddard Space Flight Center in Greenbelt, MD in missions such as the mission to Mars MAVEN, and Geostationary Operational Environmental Satellite GOES-R. She is currently the Deputy Director of the Astrophysics Division within the Science Mission Directorate at NASA Headquarters in Washington, D.C. She served as the Deputy Director for the Earth Science Division from May 2016 - October 2021. She served as Acting Director in the Earth Science Division from February 2019 to June 2020. Cauffman started as a contractor with NASA on February 1, 1988, and became a NASA employee February 11, 1991. Cauffman is the first Costa Rican woman to lead a Mars-related mission.

== Biography ==
Cauffman, daughter of María Jerónima Rojas, was born in Costa Rica in a one-parent home of very scarce resources in Hatillo. She grew up extremely poor, but refused to give up her love for space science. Cauffman had been inspired by the first Moon landing and recalled that she told her mother that she too, wanted to go to the Moon. Cauffman recalls that she had a difficult childhood, moving often and with her mother working two or three jobs at a time. Her mother, however, supported Cauffman's dreams and whenever Cauffman thought things were too hard, she looked to her mother for inspiration.

Mrs. Cauffman has been awarded the NASA the Exceptional Achievement Medal and she is a three-time recipient of the NASA Outstanding Leadership Medal. She is also a four times recipient of the NASA Acquisition Improvement Award, and numerous GSFC and HQ awards. She is a Senior Fellow on the Council for Excellence in Government. She is an Honorary Member of the National Academy of Sciences, Costa Rica. She is also an Honorary Member of the Colegio Federado de Ingenieros y de Arquitectos in Costa Rica. Due to her extensive work in outreach and STEM in Costa Rica and Latin America the Government of Costa Rica issued a stamp in her honor in 2017. Cauffman attended the University of Costa Rica before transferring to George Mason University. She received a B.S. in physics, a B.S in electrical engineering and a M.S. in electrical engineering, all from George Mason University. At George Mason, she learned English. GMU honored Ms. Cauffman achievements at their 50th Anniversary in 2018 as one of the 50 “exemplars”, alumni who exemplify the impact of a Mason degree around the world.

== Career ==
Sandra Cauffman has worked on many missions at NASA. Previously she was the Deputy Project Manager for the Mars Atmosphere and Volatile Evolution mission (MAVEN), a mission to the red planet to its atmosphere. With this position, she became widely recognized in her native country, Costa Rica.

Afterwards, she worked as Deputy Systems Program Director for the Geostationary Operational Environmental Satellites-R (GOES-R). Currently she is the Deputy Director of NASA's Division of Earth Sciences. From February 2019 until June 2020, she was Acting Director of the Earth Science Division.

As of 2014, she was only one of 4 Costa Ricans working directly for NASA. On many of the projects she worked on, including the Hubble Space Telescope Servicing Mission 1, she was often one of few female engineers on the team. Cauffman gave a Young TEDx talk in 2014 to inspire young people to dream. Cauffman wants all young people to believe that even if they have come from a poor family, that they can still reach their goals. After her retirement, she is planning to help support STEM for young people in Costa Rica. In 2016, Cauffman helped six high-school students from Costa Rica to visit Cape Canaveral as VIP guests for the launch of the GOES satellite.

In 2023, the University of Costa Rica conferred the title of Doctorate Honoris Causa for her contributions to research and development in science and technology, as well as the impulse she has given to young Costa Ricans, and especially women, to venture into these areas of knowledge.” The ceremony took place on March 8, 2023, celebrating international women’s day. She is the fourth women distinguished with this title.
