= Herman Feshbach Prize =

The Herman Feshbach Prize in Theoretical Nuclear Physics is a prize awarded annually by the American Physical Society to recognize and encourage outstanding achievements in theoretical nuclear physics. The $10,000 prize is in honor of Herman Feshbach of MIT. The prize, inaugurated in 2014, is awarded to one person or is shared among two to three persons when all of the recipients are credited with the same accomplishment.

== Prize winners ==
Source: American Physical Society

- 2014 John W. Negele
- 2015 Larry McLerran
- 2016 Xiangdong Ji
- 2017 Joseph Carlson
- 2018 Edward Shuryak
- 2019 Barry R. Holstein
- 2020 Ubirajara van Kolck
- 2021 Berndt Müller
- 2022 David B. Kaplan
- 2023 Michael J. Ramsey-Musolf
- 2024 Gail C. McLaughlin
- 2025 Richard Furnstahl
- 2026 Martin J. Savage

== See also ==
- List of physics awards
