= Roxanne Springer =

American physicist

Roxanne Patricia Springer is an American physicist, an advocate for diversity in physics, and an amateur middle distance runner. Her research in theoretical physics focuses on quantum chromodynamics and weak interactions. She is a professor of physics at Duke University.

== Education and career ==
Springer majored in physics and chemical physics at Rice University, graduating in 1985. She defended her dissertation in theoretical physics at the California Institute of Technology in 1990. Her dissertation, QCD Effects in Weak Radiative β-Meson Decays, was supervised by Mark B. Wise.

After postdoctoral research as a visiting assistant professor at the University of Wisconsin–Madison, Springer joined Duke University as an assistant professor of physics in 1992. She was promoted to associate professor in 1999 and full professor in 2011.

Springer has served in multiple leadership roles in the American Physical Society (APS), including as the founding chair of its Diversity, Equity, and Inclusion committee.

== Recognition ==
Springer was named as a Fellow of the American Physical Society (APS) in 2017, after a nomination from the APS Topical Group on Few-Body Systems and Multiparticle Dynamics, "for significant contributions to understanding the low-energy properties of hadrons, nuclei, and especially for pioneering contributions to the use of low-energy effective field theory techniques in the quest to identify and understand the fundamental symmetries of nature".

She was the 2023 recipient of the Distinguished Service Award of the APS Division of Nuclear Physics, given "for rich and passionate efforts to advocate and improve Diversity, Equity and Inclusion (DEI) for DNP members and beyond, especially those from marginalized groups, including steering the DNP Allies program, helping broaden the Allies Program to other APS Units, cofounding the DNP DEI committee, and making DNP session chair training a best practice". She also received the 2023 Francis G. Slack Award of the Southeastern Section of the APS, "for long-term, extensive, and effective service to the physics community; for her relentless and very successful efforts to improve the climate for physicists of all backgrounds at multiple scales – locally at Duke, throughout the Southeast region, nationally and beyond; and for her leadership of diversity, equity and inclusion efforts that have deeply benefited the Southeastern Section of the American Physical Society and Division of Nuclear Physics".

== Personal life ==
Springer is also a middle distance runner. She participated in 4x400 relay teams that took a W55 world record at the USATF Master's Outdoor Championships in 2021, and won the W60 gold medal at the 2024 World Masters Athletics Championships.
