= Nathan Isgur =

American-Canadian theoretical physicist

Nathan Isgur, 2000

Nathan Isgur (May 25, 1947 – July 24, 2001) was a theoretical physicist from the U.S. and Canada.

== Education ==
Isgur was born in South Houston, Texas and finished high school at South Houston High School. He was a scholarship student at Caltech. where his initial interest was in biology, but he moved toward physics and graduated with a B.Sc degree in 1968. Isgur began work on his doctorate at the University of California, Berkeley, but received his draft notice during his first year there. Denied a draft deferment to continue his education at Berkeley he went to Toronto in order to pursue his graduate studies and to avoid serving in a war he disagreed with on moral and political grounds. Isgur received a letter of introduction from Nobel Laureate Owen Chamberlain at Berkeley, to R.E. Pugh, at the University of Toronto, who took him on as a graduate student. Isgur received a Ph.D. degree in particle theory from Toronto in 1974.

== War draft ==
Isgur eventually became a Canadian citizen due to his inability to travel, having been unable to renew his U.S. passport due to his draft status, and because of his position as a war resister. This situation continued to inhibit his ability to travel to the United States until President Jimmy Carter issued a blanket amnesty for all draft resisters.

== Work ==
After completion of his doctorate, Isgur was granted a Natural Sciences and Engineering Research Council Fellowship, which allowed him to stay at Toronto as a post-doctoral candidate. He was hired as an assistant professor in the department of physics in 1976 in recognition of his outstanding merit by department head Robin Armstrong, even though he had not been able to travel to gain experience outside the department owing to passport difficulties. In 1975 Isgur published on the mixing angle of pseudo-scalar mesons due to annihilation into gluons. He embarked on a long collaboration with Gabriel Karl from the University of Guelph, involving the study of excited baryons in quark models. The principal physical idea of the model was taken from quantum chromodynamics: the forces between quarks are flavour-independent. This idea gave rise to their "QCD-improved" quark model.

Isgur had a large group of graduate students, usually 5–6 at a given time. During his 14 years at the University of Toronto, he mentored 13 Ph.D.s: Simon Capstick, Kevin Dooley, Paul Geiger, Stephen Godfrey, Gregory Grondin, Richard Kokoski, Roman Koniuk, David Kotchan, Kim Maltman, Colin Morningstar, Catherine Reader, Eric Swanson, and John Weinstein.

Two conferences he organized included the Baryon Conference (1980) in Toronto and the Advanced Study Institute on Quark Interactions at Whitehorse, Yukon (1984) useful in the development of light and heavy quark spectroscopy.

Isgur was one of the leaders of the CHEER project, this envisaged an electron ring to be built at Fermilab by a Canadian group to study electron-proton collisions. CHEER was not funded, in favor of the Tevatron proton–antiproton collider, but led to a strong Canadian involvement in the ZEUS experiment at the HERA electron-proton collider in Hamburg, Germany.

He returned to the US to the newly built accelerator at Newport News (CEBAF), which eventually became Jefferson Lab, to build an entirely new Theory Group and influence the experimental research of the Laboratory. Isgur become the head of the Theory Group at Jefferson Lab in 1990 and eventually became the chief scientist in 1996. He joined the faculty at the College of William & Mary at Williamsburg.

Isgur and Mark Wise studied the semileptonic decays of mesons with a charm and bottom quark and they discovered what is now known as the heavy quark symmetry of QCD. This symmetry, which becomes exact for infinitely heavy quarks, leads to important simplifications of form-factors in such decays.

He was also involved later on in several Natural Sciences and Engineering Research Council grant selection committees, becoming the chair of the Subatomic Physics GSC in the early 1990s. Isgur was influential in changing the manner in which nuclear and particle physics was funded in Canada, helping to bring in an "envelope" system of funding for subatomic physics. He took a strong interest in TRIUMF, Canada's premiere particle and nuclear physics facility.

He was diagnosed with multiple myeloma in 1996, and died five years later at the age 54.

== Awards ==
The work with Wise led to them receiving the Sakurai Prize of the American Physical Society (APS) in 2001, jointly with M. Voloshin. He was awarded the prize with the following citation:

For the construction of the heavy quark mass expansion and the discovery of the heavy quark symmetry in quantum chromodynamics, which led to a quantitative theory of the decays of c and b flavored hadrons.

Isgur was also a recipient of the Herzberg Prize (CAP), the Steacie Fellowship (NSERC), the Steacie Prize, and the Rutherford Memorial Medal in Physics (RSC) (1989). He was a Fellow of the Royal Society of Canada and of the American Physical Society.
