= Barry Holstein =

American physicist (b. 1943)

Barry R. Holstein
- Born: 1943 (age 82–83); Youngstown, Ohio
- Citizenship: US
- Education: Carnegie Mellon University
- Spouse: Carolyn Morrow
- Awards: Fellow of the American Physical Society; Herman Feshbach Prize in Theoretical Nuclear Physics (2019)
- Scientific career
- Fields: particle physics; phenomenology
- Institutions: Princeton University; University of Massachusetts Amherst

Barry Ralph Holstein (born 1943) is an American physicist. He is an elected Fellow of the American Physical Society, recipient of the 2019 Herman Feshbach Prize in Theoretical Nuclear Physics, and current editor of the peer-reviewed journal the Annual Review of Nuclear and Particle Science.

== Early life and education ==
Barry R. Holstein was born in 1943 in Youngstown, Ohio to parents Eleanor and Edgar R. Holstein. Holstein attended Carnegie Mellon University for his bachelor's degree (1965), master's degree (1967), and PhD (1969). In 1966, Holstein married Carolyn Morrow.

== Career ==
After graduating from Carnegie Mellon, Holstein became an instructor at Princeton University. In 1971, he left Princeton and taught at University of Massachusetts Amherst. He described his research interests as including high energy physics, nuclear phenomenology, and effective field theory. He officially retired in 2008. In 2009, he became the editor of the Annual Review of Nuclear and Particle Science, a position he holds as of 2020.

== Awards and honors ==
In 1989, Holstein was elected a Fellow of the American Physical Society on the basis of "his work on the phenomenology of weak interactions, specifically in the areas of CP violation and on the particle/nuclear physics interface". In 2019, Holstein won the Herman Feshbach Prize in Theoretical Nuclear Physics.
