= Martin J. Savage =

New Zealand theoretical physicist

- Martin J. Savage
- Education: University of Auckland (BSc, MSc); California Institute of Technology (PhD)
- Known for: Effective field theory Lattice QCD; Quantum simulation
- Awards: Humboldt Research Award (2012); Herman Feshbach Prize (2026)
- Scientific career
- Fields: Theoretical physics Nuclear physics Quantum information science
- Workplaces: University of Washington; Carnegie Mellon University
- Doctoral advisor: Mark B. Wise
- Website: iqus.uw.edu/person/martin-j-savage/

Martin John Savage is a New Zealand theoretical physicist. He is a professor of physics at the University of Washington and principal investigator of its InQubator for Quantum Simulation (IQuS). His research concerns effective field theory, lattice quantum chromodynamics and quantum simulation in nuclear and particle physics. He received the 2026 Herman Feshbach Prize in Theoretical Nuclear Physics for contributions to computational quantum chromodynamics and applications of quantum computing.

== Education and career ==
Savage attended Rutherford High School in Te Atatū, Auckland. He received a Bachelor of Science from the University of Auckland in 1984 and a Master of Science from the same university in 1985. He completed a PhD in physics at the California Institute of Technology in 1990, supervised by Mark B. Wise.

After postdoctoral appointments at Rutgers University and the University of California, San Diego, Savage held a faculty position at Carnegie Mellon University. He joined the University of Washington faculty in 1996 and became a senior fellow of the Institute for Nuclear Theory in 2013.

== Research ==
Savage's work on nuclear forces includes the development of effective field theory methods based on quantum chromodynamics (QCD). In 1998 he co-authored a power-counting scheme for the effective field theory of nucleon-nucleon interactions, expanding around the nontrivial "unitary fermion" fixed point.

In 2004, Savage co-founded the Nuclear Physics with Lattice QCD (NPLQCD) collaboration, which uses numerical QCD calculations to study nuclear interactions and light nuclei. He was a co-author of its 2017 study of proton-proton fusion and tritium beta decay. The collaboration used lattice QCD to calculate quantities governing these weak-interaction processes. The calculations used heavier-than-physical quark masses; their results were consistent with earlier estimates.

His subsequent research includes quantum algorithms and simulations of quantum field theories. In work published in 2024, Savage, Roland Farrell, Marc Illa and Anthony Ciavarella developed scalable circuits for preparing the vacuum of the Schwinger model and demonstrated them on up to 100 qubits of IBM quantum processors. Related work by the group simulated hadron dynamics in the model using 112 qubits.

== Scientific service ==
Savage served on the Nuclear Science Advisory Committee (NSAC), which advises the U.S. Department of Energy and the National Science Foundation, from 2016 to 2018. He also chaired its subcommittee on quantum information science, which delivered the report Nuclear Physics and Quantum Information Science in 2019.

He co-chaired the 2009 workshop that produced Scientific Grand Challenges: Forefront Questions in Nuclear Science and the Role of Computing at the Extreme Scale. With Joseph Carlson, he co-chaired the 2016 review that produced the Nuclear Physics Exascale Requirements Review, published in 2017. The reports assessed the computing resources and related capabilities needed for nuclear physics research.

== Mentoring ==
Five of Savage's doctoral advisees received the Kenneth G. Wilson Award for Excellence in Lattice Field Theory: Walker-Loud, Briceño, Davoudi, Wagman, and Klco.

Their subsequent early-career recognition includes an NSF CAREER Award for Klco in 2026, a Presidential Early Career Award for Scientists and Engineers for Davoudi in 2025, and a U.S. Department of Energy Early Career Research Program award for Briceño in 2018.

== Honors ==
Savage was elected a fellow of the American Physical Society in 2002. His awards include a Department of Energy Outstanding Junior Investigator award in 1995, an IBM Faculty Award in 2012 and a Humboldt Research Award in 2012. He was elected to the Washington State Academy of Sciences in 2019. In 2026, the American Physical Society awarded him the Herman Feshbach Prize in Theoretical Nuclear Physics, recognizing his work on large-scale lattice QCD simulations for nuclear physics and the use of quantum computing.
