= Soft-collinear effective theory =

Theoretical framework in quantum chromodynamics calculations

In phenomenology (physics), soft-collinear effective theory (or SCET) is an effective field theory of quantum chromodynamics (QCD) which describes the interactions of low-energy quarks and gluons. QCD exists as the ultraviolet limit of the theory.

== Motivation ==
Perturbative calculations in QCD of an observable $\mathcal{O}$ involve an expansion in the strong coupling $\alpha_\text{s}$,

$$\mathcal{O} = \sum_{i=1}^{\infty} c_n \alpha_\text{s}^n.$$

Due to the property of asymptotic freedom, the value of the coupling is rather small at the electroweak scale ($\alpha_\text{s}(M_Z)\approx 0.118$), meaning that, provided the coefficients $c_n$ are well-behaved, the series is asymptotically convergent and can be truncated at finite order to provide a physical prediction.

For certain observables, however, the coefficients $c_n$ can be rather poorly behaved. In particular, this occurs when the observable one wishes to compute has a vastly different energy scale to other, fixed scales in the problem (for example the $Z$ boson mass). The $c_n$ in general feature logarithms of the ratio of scales $L = \log(Q/M_Z)$, where $Q$ is the scale of the observable, which appear at all orders in perturbation theory, i.e. for all $n$. Indeed, the highest power of the logarithm one encounters increases with perturbative order. For $Q \ll M_Z$ these logarithms are large, and spoil the convergence of the perturbative series. This manifests itself in unphysical predictions for the observable, such as diverging (or negative) cross sections.

SCET provides a way to separate energy scales at the level of the Lagrangian, splitting individual quark and gluon fields into distinct modes with well-defined energy scalings. In this way, the observable $\mathcal{O}$ is rewritten as a combination of single-scale objects, none of which develop any large logarithms when they are evaluated at their own natural scales. This property is known as factorization. By evolution through the renormalization group, each of the individual single-scale ingredients are transported from their natural energy scales to a common scale $\mu$, and the large logarithms are resummed. This renders the prediction for the observable physical once more.

== Applications ==
SCET has been used for calculations of the decays of B mesons (quark-antiquark bound states involving a bottom quark) and the properties of jets (sprays of hadrons that emerge from particle collisions when a quark or gluon is produced). SCET has also been used to calculate electroweak interactions in Higgs boson production.
