= Robert Jaffe (physicist) =

American physicist (born 1946)

Robert Loren Jaffe (born 1946) is an American physicist and the Jane and Otto Morningstar Professor of Physics at the Massachusetts Institute of Technology (MIT). He was formerly director of the MIT Center for Theoretical Physics.

== Biography ==
Jaffe was born in Bath, Maine in 1946 to a Jewish family. His mother taught art on a volunteer basis and his father was a merchant. He was educated in public schools in Stamford, Connecticut and received his A.B. degree in physics, summa cum laude, from Princeton University, where he was valedictorian of the Class of 1968. He received his M.S. and Ph.D. degrees from Stanford University in 1971 and 1972, respectively. At Stanford he founded the Stanford Workshops on Political and Social Issues.

In 1972, Jaffe moved to MIT as a postdoctoral research associate in the Center for Theoretical Physics; he joined the faculty in 1974. From 1975 until 1979, he was an Alfred P. Sloan Foundation Research Fellow. Jaffe has spent sabbatical years at the Stanford Linear Accelerator Center (1976), Oxford University and the European Organization for Nuclear Research (CERN) (1978–79), Boston University (1986–87), and at Harvard University (1996–97). He has served on the program advisory committees of several national laboratories including the Stanford Linear Accelerator Center and Brookhaven National Laboratory. For a decade he chaired the advisory council of the physics department of Princeton University. Since 1996, Jaffe has been an advisor to and visiting scientist at the RIKEN-Brookhaven Research Center. He spent the fall term of 1997 on leave from MIT at the RIKEN-Brookhaven Center.

From February 1998 to July 2005, Jaffe was the director of the Center for Theoretical Physics at MIT. He is a Fellow of the American Physical Society and the American Association for the Advancement of Science. He has been awarded the Science Council Prize for Excellence in Teaching Undergraduates (1983), the Graduate Student Council Teaching Award (1988), and the physics department's Buechner Teaching Prize (1997). In January 1998, Jaffe was named a Margaret MacVicar Faculty Fellow in recognition of his contributions to MIT's teaching program. In 2001 he was named the Otto and Jane Morningstar Professor in the School of Science at MIT.

In 2018, Jaffe co-authored with MIT professor Washington Taylor a textbook The Physics of Energy, based on a course they taught at MIT. The book won a 2019 PROSE award from the Association of American Publishers in the category Physical Science and Mathematics Textbooks.

In 2022, the American Physical Society awarded Jaffe its Joseph A. Burton Forum Award, which recognizes "outstanding contributions to the public understanding or resolution of issues involving the interface of physics and society." The award citation read: "For bringing a physics perspective into policy discussions in academia and government over the last half-century, from the development of the Stanford Workshops on Social and Political Issues to influential work on policy and education regarding critical elements, energy, and climate."

== Publications ==
- 2018 The Physics of Energy (Robert L. Jaffe and Washington Taylor). Cambridge, United Kingdom; New York, NY: Cambridge University Press. 1st Edition. ISBN 978-1107016651
