= List of theoretical physicists =

The following is a partial list of notable theoretical physicists. Arranged by century of birth, then century of death, then year of birth, then year of death, then alphabetically by surname. For explanation of symbols, see Notes at end of this article.

== Ancient times ==
- Kaṇāda (6th century BCE or 2nd century BCE)
- Thales (c. 624 – c. 546 BCE)
- Pythagoras^* (c. 570 – c. 495 BCE)
- Democritus° (c. 460 – c. 370 BCE)
- Aristotle‡ (384–322 BCE)
- Archimedesº* (c. 287 – c. 212 BCE)
- Ptolemy (c. 100 – c. 170 AD)
- Hypatia^ªº (c. 350–370; died 415 AD)

== Middle Ages ==
- Al Farabi (c.872–c.950)
- Ibn al-Haytham (c.965–c.1040)
- Al Beruni (c.973–c.1048)
- Omar Khayyám (c.1048–c.1131)
- Bhaskara II (c.1114–c.1185)
- Mu'ayyad al-Din al-Urdi (c.1200–c.1266)
- Nasir al-Din Tusi (1201–1274)
- Jean Buridan (1301–c.1359/62)
- Nicole Oresme (c.1320/1325–1382)
- Jamshid al-Kashi (1380–1429)
- Sigismondo Polcastro (1384–1473)
- Ulugh Beg (1394–1449)

== 15th–16th century ==
- Giovanni Bianchini (1410–1469)
- Leonardo da Vinci (1452–1519)
- Nicolaus Copernicusº (1473–1543)

== 16th century and 16th–17th centuries ==
- Gerolamo Cardano (1501–1576)
- Tycho Brahe (1546–1601)
- Giordano Bruno (1548–1600)
- Galileo Galileiº* (1564–1642)
- Johannes Keplerº (1571–1630)
- Benedetto Castelli (1578–1643)
- René Descartes‡^ (1596–1650)
- Bonaventura Cavalieri (1598–1647)

== 17th century ==
- Pierre de Fermat (1607–1665)
- Evangelista Torricelli (1608–1647)
- Giovanni Alfonso Borelli (1608–1679)
- Jeremiah Horrocks (1618–1641)
- Francesco Maria Grimaldi (1618–1663)
- Jacques Rohault (1618–1672)
- Blaise Pascal^ (1623–1662)
- Erhard Weigel (1625–1699)
- Christiaan Huygens^ (1629–1695)
- Ignace-Gaston Pardies (1636–1673)

== 17th–18th centuries ==
- Vincenzo Viviani (1622–1703)
- Christopher Wren (1632–1723)
- Robert Hooke (1635–1703)
- Isaac Newton^*º (1642–1727)
- Gottfried Leibniz^ (1646–1716)
- John Flamsteed (1646–1719)
- Edmond Pourchot (1651–1734)
- Jacob Bernoulli (1655–1705)
- Edmond Halley (1656–1742)
- Luigi Guido Grandi (1671–1742)
- Jakob Hermann (1678–1733)
- Jean-Jacques d'Ortous de Mairan (1678–1771)
- Nicolaus II Bernoulli (1695–1726)
- Pierre Louis Maupertuis (1698–1759)
- Daniel Bernoulli (1700–1782)

== 18th century ==
- Leonhard Euler^ (1707–1783)
- Vincenzo Riccati (1707–1785)
- Mikhail Lomonosov (1711–1765)
- Laura Bassiª* (1711–1778)
- Roger Joseph Boscovich (1711–1787)
- Johann Samuel König (1712–1757)
- Alexis Clairaut (1713–1765)
- Jean le Rond d'Alembert (1717–1783)

== 18th–19th centuries ==
- Franz Aepinus (1724–1802)
- Henry Cavendish (1731–1810)
- Charles Coulomb (1736–1806)
- Joseph Lagrange^º (1736–1813)
- Pierre-Simon Laplace (1749–1827)
- Jurij Vega (1754–1802)
- John Dalton^ (1766–1844)
- Joseph Fourier^ (1768–1830)
- Thomas Young‡* (1773–1829)
- Jean-Baptiste Biot (1774–1862)
- Étienne-Louis Malus (1775–1812)
- André-Marie Ampère (1775–1836)
- Sophie Germain (1776–1831)
- Carl Friedrich Gauss^ (1777–1855)
- Louis Poinsot (1777–1859)
- Siméon Denis Poisson (1781–1840)
- Giovanni Antonio Amedeo Plana (1781–1864)
- Friedrich Wilhelm Bessel (1784–1846)
- Claude-Louis Navier (1785–1836)
- François Arago (1786–1853)
- Augustin-Jean Fresnel (1788–1827)
- Georg Ohm (1789–1854)
- Augustin-Louis Cauchy (1789–1857)
- Félix Savart (1791–1841)
- Ottaviano-Fabrizio Mossotti (1791–1863)
- Gaspard-Gustave de Coriolis (1792–1843)
- George Green^ (1793–1841)
- Michel Chasles (1793–1880)
- Gabrio Piola (1794–1850)
- Gabriel Lamé (1795–1870)
- Nicolas Léonard Sadi Carnot (1796–1832)
- Nikolai Brashman (1796–1866)
- Andreas von Ettingshausen (1796–1878)
- Jean Léonard Marie Poiseuille (1797–1869)
- Jean-Marie Duhamel (1797–1872)
- Franz Ernst Neumann (1798–1895)
- Benoît Paul Émile Clapeyron (1799–1864)

== 19th century ==
- Mikhail Ostrogradsky (1801–1862)
- Carl Gustav Jacob Jacobi (1804–1851)
- Viktor Bunyakovsky (1804–1889)
- William Hamilton^º (1805–1865)
- Samuel Earnshaw (1805–1888)
- Julius Weisbach (1806–1871)
- Athanase Dupré (1808–1869)
- Joseph Liouville (1809–1882)
- Auguste Bravais (1811–1863)
- Osip Ivanovich Somov (1815–1876)
- Charles-Eugène Delaunay (1816–1872)
- Jonathan Homer Lane (1819–1880)
- William John Macquorn Rankine (1820–1872)
- Pafnuty Chebyshev (1821–1894)
- Hermann von Helmholtz‡† (1821–1894)
- Johann Josef Loschmidt (1821–1895)
- August Krönig (1822–1879)
- Rudolf Clausius (1822–1888)
- August Davidov (1823–1885)
- Gustav Kirchhoff (1824–1887)
- Bernhard Riemann (1826–1866)
- Ludvig Lorenz (1829–1891)
- James Clerk Maxwell (1831–1879)
- Johann Bauschinger (1834–1893)
- Josef Stefan (1835–1893)
- Eugen von Lommel (1837–1899)
- Carlo Alberto Castigliano (1847–1884)
- Sofia Kovalevskaya (1850–1891)
- Pierre Henri Hugoniot (1851–1887)
- Heinrich Hertz* (1857–1894)

== 19th–20th centuries ==
- Sir George Stokes, 1st Baronet (1819–1903)
- William Thomson, 1st Baron Kelvin* (1824–1907)
- Rodolphe Radau (1835–1911)
- Christian Otto Mohr (1835–1918)
- Johannes Diderik van der Waals (1837–1923)
- Thorvald N. Thiele (1838–1910)
- George William Hill (1838–1914)
- Ernst Mach (1838–1916)
- Viktor von Lang (1838–1921)
- J. Willard Gibbs†^ (1839–1903)
- Ernst Abbe (1840–1905)
- Osborne Reynolds (1842–1912)
- Karl Exner (1842–1914)
- John William Strutt, 3rd Baron Rayleigh (1842–1919)
- Joseph Valentin Boussinesq (1842–1929)
- Ludwig Boltzmann (1844–1906)
- Nikolay Umov (1846–1915)
- Mór Réthy (1846–1925)
- Nikolay Zhukovsky (1847–1921)
- Diederik Korteweg (1848–1941)
- Horace Lamb (1849–1934)
- Woldemar Voigt (1850–1919)
- Oliver Heaviside (1850–1925)
- Jacobus Kapteyn (1851–1922)
- Arthur Schuster (1851–1934)
- Jacobus Henricus van 't Hoff (1852–1911)
- John Henry Poynting (1852–1914)
- Orest Khvolson (1852–1934)
- Hendrik Lorentz (1853–1928)
- Henri Poincaré (1854–1912)
- Alfred Barnard Basset (1854–1930)
- Emil Cohn (1854–1944)
- Marcel Brillouin (1854–1948)
- Max Margules (1856–1920)
- Carl Runge (1856–1927)
- Anatole Leduc (1856–1937)
- Aleksandr Lyapunov (1857–1918)
- Samuel Oppenheim (1857–1928)
- Konstantin Tsiolkovsky (1857–1935)
- Joseph Larmor (1857–1942)
- Maurice Couette (1858–1943)
- Max Planck (1858–1947)
- Svante Arrhenius (1859–1927)
- Karl Heun (1859–1929)
- Vito Volterra (1860–1940)
- Pierre Duhem (1861–1916)
- Emil Wiechert (1861–1928)
- Robert Emden (1862–1940)
- Paul Drude (1863–1906)
- Arthur Gordon Webster (1863–1923)
- Augustus Edward Hough Love (1863–1940)
- Hermann Minkowski (1864–1909)
- Vladimir Steklov (1864–1926)
- Wilhelm Wien (1864–1928)
- Władysław Natanson (1864–1937)
- Walther Nernst (1864–1941)
- Pierre Weiss (1865–1940)
- Pieter Zeeman (1865–1943)
- Jacques Hadamard (1865–1963)
- Gustav de Vries (1866–1934)
- Martin Kutta (1867–1944)
- Arnold Sommerfeld (1868–1951)
- Gustav Mie (1868–1957)
- Sergey Chaplygin (1869–1942)
- Nikolai Kasterin (1869–1947)
- Élie Cartan (1869–1951)
- Alfred-Marie Liénard (1869–1958)
- Louis Bachelier (1870–1946)
- Ernest Rutherford (1871–1937)
- Émile Jouguet (1871–1943)
- Boris Galerkin (1871–1945)
- Martin Knudsen (1871–1949)
- Émile Borel (1871–1956)
- Marian Smoluchowski (1872–1917)
- Paul Langevin (1872–1946)
- Ludwik Silberstein (1872–1948)
- Théophile de Donder (1872–1957)
- Karl Schwarzschild (1873–1916)
- Alfred Robb (1873–1936)
- Tullio Levi-Civita (1873–1941)
- Constantin Carathéodory (1873–1950)
- H. Stanley Allen (1873–1954)
- E. T. Whittaker (1873–1956)
- Friedrich Hasenöhrl (1874–1915)
- Vagn Walfrid Ekman (1874–1954)
- Hans Reissner (1874–1967)
- Max Abraham (1875–1922)
- Louis Napoleon George Filon (1875–1937)
- Vladimir Ignatowski (1875–1942)
- Gilbert N. Lewis (1875–1946)
- Ludwig Prandtl (1875–1953)
- Tatyana Ehrenfest-Afanasevaª (1876–1964)
- James Jeans° (1877–1946)
- Eduard Grüneisen (1877–1949)
- Georg Hamel (1877–1954)
- Walther Ritz (1878–1909)
- Marcel Grossmann (1878–1936)
- Czesław Białobrzeski (1878–1953)
- Lise Meitner (1878–1968)
- Stephen Timoshenko (1878–1972)
- Leonid Mandelstam (1879–1944)
- Carl Wilhelm Oseen (1879–1944)
- Albert Einsteinº (1879–1955)
- Nikolay Krylov (1879–1955)
- Max von Laue (1879–1960)
- Otto Sackur (1880–1914)
- Paul Ehrenfest (1880–1933)
- Leonard Ornstein (1880–1941)
- Nikolai Papaleksi (1880–1947)
- Alfred J. Lotka (1880–1949)
- Abram Ioffe (1880–1960)
- Oswald Veblen (1880–1960)
- Gunnar Nordström (1881–1923)
- Jun Ishiwara (1881–1947)
- Walter Rogowski (1881–1947)
- Richard Tolman° (1881–1948)
- Gustav Herglotz (1881–1953)
- Irving Langmuir (1881–1957)
- Theodore von Kármán (1881–1963)
- Erwin Madelung (1881–1972)
- Ebenezer Cunningham (1881–1977)
- Emmy Noether^ª (1882–1935)
- Arthur Eddington (1882–1944)
- Harry Bateman (1882–1946)
- Max Born (1882–1970)
- Richard von Mises (1883–1953)
- Paul Sophus Epstein (1883–1966)
- Ludwig Hopf (1884–1939)
- Arthur Erich Haas (1884–1941)
- George David Birkhoff (1884–1944)
- David Enskog (1884–1947)
- Peter Debye (1884–1966)
- Philipp Frank (1884–1966)
- Vsevolod Frederiks (1885–1944)
- Naum Idelson (1885–1951)
- Theodor Kaluza (1885–1954)
- Hermann Weyl (1885–1955)
- Niels Bohr (1885–1962)
- Victor Robertovich Bursian (1886–1945)
- Rudolf Seeliger (1886–1965)
- Friedrich Kottler (1886–1965)
- Paul Lévy (1886–1971)
- Geoffrey Taylor (1886–1975)
- Walter H. Schottky (1886–1976)
- Richard Becker (1887–1955)
- Erwin Schrödinger (1887–1961)
- Charles Galton Darwin (1887–1962)
- Adriaan Fokker (1887–1972)
- Erich Kretschmann (1887–1973)
- Hendrika Johanna van Leeuwen (1887–1974)
- Waloddi Weibull (1887–1979)
- Alexander Weinstein (1887–1979)
- Ralph Walter Graystone Wyckoff (1897–1994)
- Alexander Friedmann (1888–1925)
- Walther Kossel (1888–1956)
- Viktor Trkal (1888–1956)
- Wilhelm Lenz (1888–1957)
- Georges Darmois (1888–1960)
- Antonio Signorini (1888–1963)
- Frits Zernike (1888–1966)
- Sydney Chapman (1888–1970)
- Joseph Proudman (1888–1975)
- Alfred Landé (1888–1976)
- Hans Thirring (1888–1976)
- Paul Peter Ewald (1888–1985)
- Ralph H. Fowler (1889–1944)
- Léon Brillouin (1889–1969)
- Wojciech Rubinowicz (1889–1974)
- Harry Nyquist (1889–1976)
- Edwin C. Kemble (1889–1984)
- Yoshio Nishina (1890–1951)
- Yurii Aleksandrovich Krutkov (1890–1952)
- Josef Lense (1890–1985)
- Arthur March (1891–1957)
- George Barker Jeffery (1891–1957)
- Michael Polanyi (1891–1976)
- Nikoloz Muskhelishvili (1891–1976)
- Philippe Le Corbeiller (1891–1980)
- Harold Jeffreys (1891–1989)
- Arthur Holly Compton (1892–1962)
- Karl Herzfeld (1892–1978)
- Louis de Broglie (1892–1987)
- Walter Gordon (1893–1939)
- Meghnad Saha (1893–1956)
- Erwin Fues (1893–1970)
- Cornelius Lanczos (1893–1974)
- Francis Murnaghan (1893–1976)
- Adolf Kratzer (1893–1983)
- Yakov Frenkel (1894–1952)
- Hans Kramers (1894–1952)
- Pyotr Lukirsky (1894–1954)
- John Lennard-Jones (1894–1954)
- Aleksandr Khinchin (1894–1959)
- Norbert Wiener (1894–1964)
- Georges Lemaître (1894–1966)
- Satyendra Nath Bose (1894–1974)
- Oskar Klein (1894–1977)
- Étienne Biéler (1895–1929)
- Hugo Tetrode (1895–1931)
- Pyotr Savvich Tartakovsky (1895–1940)
- Fritz Zerner (1895–1951)
- Karel Niessen (1895–1967)
- Igor Tamm (1895–1971)
- Hans Falkenhagen (1895–1971)
- Vasily Vladimirovich Shuleikin (1895–1979)
- Jan Burgers (1895–1981)
- Aldo Pontremoli (1896–1928)
- William Reginald Dean (1896–1973)
- Boris Podolsky (1896–1966)
- Erich Hückel (1896–1980)
- Robert S. Mulliken (1896–1986)
- Nikolay Semyonov (1896–1986)
- Friedrich Hund (1896–1997)
- Myron Mathisson (1897–1940)
- Douglas Hartree (1897–1958)
- Lewi Tonks (1897–1971)
- Ivan Stranski (1897–1979)
- John Lighton Synge (1897–1995)
- Ali Moustafa Mosharafa (1898–1950)
- Ronald Wilfred Gurney (1898–1953)
- Leó Szilárd (1898–1964)
- Egil Hylleraas (1898–1965)
- Leopold Infeld (1898–1968)
- Yakov Dorfman (1898–1974)
- Vladimir Fock (1898–1974)
- Gregor Wentzel (1898–1978)
- Frank C. Hoyt (1898–1980)
- Robert d'Escourt Atkinson (1898–1982)
- Isidor Isaac Rabi (1898–1988)
- Ivar Waller (1898–1991)
- Theodor Sexl (1899–1967)
- Edmund Clifton Stoner (1899–1968)
- John Hasbrouck Van Vleck (1899–1980)
- Gregory Breit (1899–1981)
- Otto Halpern (1899–1982)
- Lothar Wolfgang Nordheim (1899–1985)
- Gleb Wataghin (1899–1986)
- Pelageya Polubarinova-Kochina (1899–1999)
- Wilhelm Cauer (1900–1945)
- Fritz London (1900–1954)
- Wolfgang Pauli (1900–1958)
- Walter Tollmien (1900–1968)
- William V. Houston (1900–1968)
- John C. Slater (1900–1976)
- Beryl May Dent (1900–1977)
- Mikhail Lavrentyev (1900–1980)
- Vladimir Rojansky (1900–1981)
- Robert Bruce Lindsay (1900–1985)
- George Eugene Uhlenbeck (1900–1988)
- Lev Gerasimovich Loitsyanskii (1900–1991)
- Ernst Ising (1900–1998)

== 20th century ==
- Nikolai Kochin (1901–1944)
- Aleksandr Andronov (1901–1952)
- Enrico Fermi* (1901–1954)
- Werner Heisenberg (1901–1976)
- Werner Braunbeck (1901–1977)
- Carl Wagner (1901–1977)
- Anatoliy Lure (1901–1980)
- Karl Bechert (1901–1981)
- Henry Eyring (1901–1981)
- Kurt Otto Friedrichs (1901–1982)
- Grete Hermann (1901–1984)
- Yuri Rumer (1901–1985)
- Edwin Albrecht Uehling (1901–1985)
- Francis Perrin (1901–1992)
- Linus Pauling (1901–1994)
- William Allis (1901–1999)
- Alexander A. Witt (1902–1938)
- Michael Sadowsky (1902–1967)
- Otto Laporte (1902–1971)
- Carl Eckart (1902–1973)
- Edward Condon (1902–1974)
- Samuel Abraham Goudsmit (1902–1978)
- Pascual Jordan (1902–1980)
- Paul Dirac (1902–1984)
- Alfred Kastler (1902–1984)
- Eugene Wigner (1902–1995)
- Katharine Way (1902–1995)
- Hans Hellmann (1903–1938)
- John von Neumann (1903–1957)
- Howard P. Robertson (1903–1961)
- Lars Onsager (1903–1976)
- Jacques Yvon (1903–1979)
- Helmut Hönl (1903–1981)
- Mikhail Leontovich (1903–1981)
- Philip M. Morse (1903–1985)
- Andrey Kolmogorov (1903–1987)
- Guido Beck (1903–1988)
- Sydney Goldstein (1903–1989)
- Llewellyn Thomas (1903–1992)
- Bartel Leendert van der Waerden (1903–1996)
- Bertha Swirles (1903–1999)
- Meredith Gwynne Evans (1904–1952)
- Robert Oppenheimer* (1904–1967)
- George Gamow‡° (1904–1968)
- Ilya Kibel (1904–1970)
- Léon Rosenfeld (1904–1974)
- Adolfas Jucys (1904–1974)
- André Lallemand (1904–1978)
- Otto Robert Frisch (1904–1979)
- Christian Møller (1904–1980)
- Walter Heitler (1904–1981)
- Joseph Edward Mayer (1904–1983)
- Torsten Gustafson (1904–1987)
- Lev Gurevich (1904–1990)
- Walter M. Elsasser (1904–1991)
- Dmitri Ivanenko (1904–1994)
- Ralph Kronig (1904–1995)
- Yulii Khariton (1904–1996)
- Louis Néel (1904–2000)
- George Placzek (1905–1955)
- Rupert Wildt (1905–1976)
- Felix Bloch (1905–1983)
- Ernst Stueckelberg (1905–1984)
- Herbert Fröhlich (1905–1991)
- Clarence Zener (1905–1993)
- Nevill Francis Mott (1905–1996)
- Harry Jones (1905–1996)
- Matvei Bronstein (1906–1938)
- Ettore Majorana (1906–1938)
- Maria Goeppert-Mayerª (1906–1972)
- Eugene Feenberg (1906–1977)
- Maria I. Petrashen (1906–1977)
- Kurt Gödel (1906–1978)
- Sin-Itiro Tomonaga (1906–1979)
- William Houlder Zachariasen (1906–1979)
- Fritz Sauter (1906–1983)
- Louis Rosenhead (1906–1984)
- Banesh Hoffmann (1906–1986)
- Mikhail G. Veselov (1906–1987)
- Alan Herries Wilson (1906–1995)
- John Gamble Kirkwood (1907–1959)
- J. Hans D. Jensen (1907–1973)
- Dmitry Blokhintsev (1907–1979)
- Hermann Arthur Jahn (1907–1979)
- Hideki Yukawa (1907–1981)
- Herbert Jehle (1907–1983)
- Wendell H. Furry (1907–1984)
- Rudolf Peierls (1907–1995)
- Achilles Papapetrou (1907–1997)
- George Rankine Irwin (1907–1998)
- William Rarita (1907–1999)
- Leonid I. Sedov (1907–1999)
- Wu Ta-You (1907–2000)
- Semen P. Shubin (1908–1938)
- Jacques Solomon (1908–1942)
- Arie Bijl (1908–1945)
- Felix Gantmacher (1908–1964)
- Lev Landau (1908–1968)
- Alexander Stepanov (1908–1972)
- Anatoly Vlasov (1908–1975)
- Lyubomir Krastanov (1908–1977)
- Harrie Massey (1908–1983)
- Moses Blackman (1908–1983)
- Șerban Țițeica (1908–1985)
- Valentine Bargmann (1908–1989)
- Ilya Frank (1908–1990)
- Solomon Mikhlin (1908–1990)
- John Bardeen (1908–1991)
- Milton S. Plesset (1908–1991)
- Pallady Pavinsky (1908–1993)
- Moisey Markov (1908–1994)
- Josef Meixner (1908–1994)
- Hannes Alfvén (1908–1995)
- Viktor Ambartsumian (1908–1996)
- Mikhail Elyashevich (1908–1996)
- Sergei Mikhailovich Rytov (1908–1996)
- Richard Tousey (1908–1997)
- Sergey Khristianovich (1908–2000)
- Georg Busch (physicist) (1908–2000)
- Hans Euler (1909–1941)
- Homi J. Bhabha (1909–1966)
- Stanislaw Ulam (1909–1984)
- Friedrich Bopp (1909–1987)
- William Penney, Baron Penney (1909–1991)
- Nikolay Bogolyubov (1909–1992)
- Gian Carlo Wick (1909–1992)
- Nathan Rosen (1909–1995)
- Richard Duffin (1909–1996)
- Ratip Berker (1909–1997)
- Robert Serber (1909–1997)
- Hendrik Casimir (1909–2000)
- James Stanley Hey (1909–2000)
- David A. Frank-Kamenetskii (1910–1970)
- Aleksei Zinovyevich Petrov (1910–1972)
- Charles Coulson (1910–1974)
- Theodor Förster (1910–1974)
- Tjalling Koopmans (1910–1985)
- Arseny Sokolov (1910–1986)
- Anatoly Dorodnitsyn (1910–1994)
- Subrahmanyan Chandrasekhar (1910–1995)
- Vasiliy S. Fursov (1910–1998)
- José Enrique Moyal (1910–1998)
- Sergei Vonsovsky (1910–1998)
- Shoichi Sakata (1911–1970)
- Arnold Nordsieck (1911–1971)
- Tatiana Kontorovaª (1911–1977)
- Mstislav Keldysh (1911–1978)
- Carlo Cattaneo (1911–1979)
- Gregory Hugh Wannier (1911–1983)
- Klaus Fuchs (1911–1988)
- Arkady Migdal (1911–1991)
- Paul Weiss (1911–1991)
- Walter Franz (1911–1992)
- Wladyslaw Opechowski (1911–1993)
- Richard Buckingham (1911–1994)
- William Alfred Fowler (1911–1995)
- Raymond Lyttleton (1911–1995)
- Menahem Max Schiffer (1911–1997)
- Nicholas Kemmer (1911–1998)
- Abraham H. Taub (1911–1998)
- Aleksander Akhiezer (1911–2000)
- R. E. Siday (1912–1956)
- Marie-Antoinette Tonnelat (1912–1980)
- Heinrich Welker (1912–1981)
- Arnold Münster (1912–1990)
- Konrad Bleuler (1912–1992)
- Mikhail Volkenshtein (1912–1992)
- Alexander Davydov (1912–1993)
- Siegfried Flügge (1912–1997)
- Martin Schwarzschild (1912–1997)
- Aleksandr Aleksandrov (1912–1999)
- Sidney Dancoff (1913–1951)
- Hartland Snyder (1913–1962)
- Isaak Pomeranchuk (1913–1966)
- Vladimir Borisovich Berestetskii (1913–1977)
- Ludwig Waldmann (1913–1980)
- Boris Stepanov (1913–1987)
- Frederik Belinfante (1913–1991)
- Bruno Pontecorvo (1913–1993)
- Józef Lubański (1914–1946)
- Alexander Kompaneyets (1914–1974)
- Josef-Maria Jauch (1914–1974)
- Henry Primakoff (1914–1983)
- Mark Kac (1914–1984)
- Yakov Zeldovich (1914–1987)
- Bernard Lippmann (1914–1988)
- Paul Ledoux (1914–1988)
- Mário Schenberg (1914–1990)
- Lyman Spitzer (1914–1997)
- George Michael Volkoff (1914–2000)
- Robert R. Wilson (1914–2000)
- Leonard I. Schiff (1915–1971)
- Ely Eugene Bell (1915–1973)
- Günther Leibfried (1915–1977)
- Theodore Holstein (1915–1985)
- Evgeny Lifshitz (1915–1985)
- Georgii Skrotskii (1915–1992)
- Sudhansu Datta Majumdar (1915–1997)
- Leonid Biberman (1915–1998)
- Oleg Firsov (1915–1998)
- André Lichnerowicz (1915–1998)
- Nicholas Metropolis (1915–1999)
- John D. Eshelby (1916–1981)
- Elliott Waters Montroll (1916–1983)
- Iosif Shklovsky (1916–1985)
- Kirill Petrovich Stanyukovich (1916–1989)
- Winston H. Bostick (1916–1991)
- Robert Marshak (1916–1992)
- Kirill Tolpygo (1916–1994)
- Robert Dicke (1916–1997)
- Hu Ning (1916–1997)
- Robert G. Sachs (1916–1999)
- Alexey Galanin (1916–1999)
- Per-Olov Löwdin (1916–2000)
- John Alexander Simpson (1916–2000)
- Herbert Friedman (1916–2000)
- Theodore H. Berlin (1917–1962)
- Imre Fényes (1917–1977)
- Ilya Lifshitz (1917–1982)
- Yevgeny Zababakhin (1917–1984)
- Solomon Pekar (1917–1985)
- James Rainwater (1917–1986)
- Veniamin Levich (1917–1987)
- Eli Sternberg (1917–1988)
- Yurii Perlin (1917–1990)
- David Bohm (1917–1992)
- Yakov Smorodinskii (1917–1992)
- Dmitry Zubarev (1917–1992)
- Tosio Kato (1917–1999)
- Herman Feshbach (1917–2000)
- Richard Feynman (1918–1988)
- Res Jost (1918–1990)
- Henry Hurwitz Jr. (1918–1992)
- Harold Hopkins (1918–1994)
- Kirill Gurov (1918–1994)
- Julian Schwinger (1918–1994)
- Max Dresden (1918–1997)
- Irving Segal (1918–1998)
- Iosif Shapiro (1918–1999)
- James Hamilton (1918–2000)
- Abraham Pais (1918–2000)
- Hendrik C. van de Hulst (1918–2000)
- Paul Taunton Matthews (1919–1987)
- Herbert Callen (1919–1993)
- Pieter Maarten de Wolff (1919–1998)
- Clifford Truesdell (1919–2000)
- Ian Sneddon (1919–2000)
- Julius Ashkin (1920–1982)
- George H. Vineyard (1920–1987)
- Ryogo Kubo (1920–1995)
- Gerhart Lüders (1920–1995)
- Herbert S. Green (1920–1999)
- George Batchelor (1920–2000)
- Lev Rapoport (1920–2000)
- Sergei Tyablikov (1921–1968)
- Sigurd Zienau (1921–1976)
- Alfred Schild (1921–1977)
- Andrei Sakharov (1921–1989)
- John M. Blatt (1921–1990)
- Feza Gürsey (1921–1992)
- Eduardo R. Caianiello (1921–1993)
- Alexey P. Rudik (1921–1993)
- Igor Ternov (1921–1996)
- Melville S. Green (1922–1979)
- Ernst G. Straus (1922–1983)
- Günter Kelbg (1922–1988)
- Gottfried Falk (1922–1991)
- Yuri Golfand (1922–1994)
- Lawrence Biedenharn (1922–1996)
- Keith Burton (1922–1996)
- Jens Lindhard (1922–1997)
- Edwin Thompson Jaynes (1922–1998)
- David Breed Beard (1922–1998)
- Claude Bloch (1923–1971)
- Ernest Helmut Sondheimer (1923–1973)
- Kurt Symanzik (1923–1983)
- Harold Grad (1923–1986)
- Joaquin Mazdak Luttinger (1923–1997)
- Gregory Pikus (1923–1998)
- Louis Michel (1923–1999)
- Victor M. Galitskii (1924–1981)
- Léon Van Hove (1924–1990)
- Gregory Garibian (1924–1991)
- Juan José Giambiagi (1924–1996)
- Harry Lehmann (1924–1998)
- Efim Fradkin (1924–1999)
- John Clive Ward (1924–2000)
- Dmitry V. Volkov (1925–1996)
- Sam Treiman (1925–1999)
- Stig Lundqvist (1925–2000)
- Gunnar Källén (1926–1968)
- Rem Khokhlov (1926–1977)
- Stuart Thomas Butler (1926–1982)
- Heinz Bilz (1926–1986)
- Eugene P. Gross (1926–1991)
- Asım Orhan Barut (1926–1994)
- Abdus Salam (1926–1996)
- David Abramovich Kirzhnits (1926–1998)
- Dennis Sciama (1926–1999)
- Mikhail Kazarnovskii (1926–1999)
- Rudolph Max Sternheimer (1926–2000)
- Aneesur Rahman (1927–1987)
- Yuri Yappa (1927–1998)
- Rolf Landauer (1927–1999)
- Robert Mills (1927–1999)
- John Stewart Bell (1928–1990)
- Richard E. Cutkosky (1928–1993)
- Gurgen Askaryan (1928–1997)
- Andrey Amatuni (1928–1999)
- Mikhail Krivoglaz (1929–1988)
- Roland Dobrushin (1929–1995)
- David Klyshko (1929–2000)
- Viktor Kovarskii (1929–2000)
- Gernot Eder (physicist) (1929–2000)
- Hugh Everett (1930–1982)
- Vladimir Gribov (1930–1997)
- Ruslan Stratonovich (1930–1997)
- Alfred Ivanovich Baz (1931–1978)
- Felix Berezin (1931–1980)
- John Hubbard (1931–1980)
- Revaz Dogonadze (1931–1985)
- Emanuil Kaner (1931–1986)
- Luciano Fonda (1931–1998)
- Kenneth Alan Johnson (1931–1999)
- Fredrik Zachariasen (1931–1999)
- Igor Kobzarev (1932–1991)
- Walter Marshall (1932–1996)
- Leonid Khalfin (1932–1998)
- J. J. Sakurai (1933–1982)
- Leopoldo Máximo Falicov (1933–1995)
- Euan J. Squires (1933–1996)
- Lochlainn O'Raifeartaigh (1933–2000)
- Shivaramakrishnan Pancharatnam (1934–1969)
- William Fuller Brown Jr. (1934–1983)
- M. A. B. Beg (1934–1990)
- Alexey Andreevich Anselm (1934–1998)
- Benjamin W. Lee (1935–1977)
- Vadim Berezinskii (1935–1980)
- David Adler (1935–1987)
- Peter A. Carruthers (1935–1997)
- Victor Popov (1937–1994)
- Karl Kraus (1938–1988)
- Raphael Høegh-Krohn (1938–1988)
- Roger Dashen (1938–1995)
- Claude Itzykson (1938–1995)
- Judah Moshe Eisenberg (1938–1998)
- Heinz Pagels (1939–1988)
- Arkady Aronov (1939–1994)
- Michael Marinov (1939–2000)
- Shang-keng Ma (1940–1983)
- Herbert H. Chen (1942–1987)
- Dan Walls (1942–1999)
- Giuliano Preparata (1942–2000)
- Joël Scherk (1946–1980)
- Marko V. Jaric (1952–1997)
- Elizabeth Gardnerª (1957–1988)
- Vadim Knizhnik (1962–1987)

== 20th–21st century ==
- Hans Bethe° (1906–2005)
- Melba Phillips (1907–2004)
- László Tisza (1907–2009)
- Victor Weisskopf (1908–2002)
- Edward Teller (1908–2003)
- Arthur Geoffrey Walker (1909–2001)
- Werner Romberg (1909–2003)
- Isaak Dykman (1911–2001)
- Leslie Howarth (1911–2001)
- Frederick Seitz (1911–2008)
- John Wheeler (1911–2008)
- Ugo Fano (1912–2001)
- Naum Meiman (1912–2001)
- Horace W. Babcock (1912–2003)
- Evgenii Feinberg (1912–2005)
- Markus Fierz (1912–2006)
- Carl Friedrich von Weizsäcker (1912–2007)
- Harald Keres (1912–2010)
- Maurice Pryce (1913–2003)
- Leonard Eisenbud (1913–2004)
- Willis Lamb (1913–2008)
- Isao Imai (1914–2004)
- Georgii Petrashen (1914–2004)
- James Stark Koehler (1914–2006)
- Conyers Herring (1914–2009)
- Anatole Abragam (1914–2011)
- Fred Hoyle (1915–2001)
- Peter Bergmann (1915–2002)
- Morton Hamermesh (1915–2003)
- Philip Morrison (1915–2005)
- P. R. Wallace (1915–2006)
- Ivan Supek (1915–2007)
- David Turnbull (1915–2007)
- Jan Korringa (1915–2015)
- Charles H. Townes (1915–2015)
- Harold Neville Vazeille Temperley (1915–2017)
- Robert Hanbury Brown (1916–2002)
- Alexey Bonch-Bruevich (1916–2006)
- Frank Nabarro (1916–2006)
- Vitaly Ginzburg (1916–2009)
- Robert F. Christy (1916–2012)
- Paolo Budinich (1916–2013)
- Charles Kittel (1916–2019)
- Ilya Prigogine (1917–2003)
- Leonid Brekhovskikh (1917–2005)
- Yurii Mitropolskiy (1917–2008)
- George C. Baldwin (1917–2010)
- Morikazu Toda (1917–2010)
- Norman H. March (1917–2020)
- Arthur Iberall (1918–2002)
- David George Kendall (1918–2007)
- Günther Ludwig (1918–2007)
- Theodore A. Welton (1918–2010)
- Clemens C. J. Roothaan (1918–2019)
- Leslie Lawrance Foldy (1919–2001)
- Dirk ter Haar (1919–2002)
- Rolf Hagedorn (1919–2003)
- Hermann Bondi (1919–2005)
- Huang Kun (1919–2005)
- Wolfgang K. H. Panofsky (1919–2007)
- Robert Pound (1919–2010)
- Peter Westervelt (1919–2015)
- Isaak Khalatnikov (1919–2021)
- Richard Q. Twiss (1920–2005)
- Brian Pippard (1920–2008)
- Chushiro Hayashi (1920–2010)
- Kenneth Le Couteur (1920–2011)
- Cyril Domb (1920–2012)
- Theodore H. Geballe (1920–2021)
- James Bruce French (1921–2002)
- Felix Villars (1921–2002)
- Giovanni Rossi Lomanitz (1921–2003)
- Francis E. Low (1921–2007)
- Ostap Parasyuk (1921–2007)
- Akiva Yaglom (1921–2007)
- Andrew M. Gleason (1921–2008)
- Marcos Moshinsky (1921–2009)
- Nico van Kampen (1921–2013)
- Eugen Merzbacher (1921–2013)
- Albert Messiah (1921–2013)
- Jacques Friedel (1921–2014)
- Moisei Isaakovich Kaganov (1921–2014)
- Takeo Matsubara (1921–2014)
- Bernard d'Espagnat (1921–2015)
- Harry J. Lipkin (1921–2015)
- Yoichiro Nambu (1921–2015)
- Robert Parr (1921–2017)
- Kenneth M. Watson (1921–2023)
- Louis Witten (born 1921)
- Peter Mazur (1922–2001)
- Melvin Lax (1922–2002)
- William Cochran (1922–2003)
- Behram Kurşunoğlu (1922–2003)
- Norman Myles Kroll (1922–2004)
- Herbert Goldstein (1922–2005)
- Karen Ter-Martirosian (1922–2005)
- Aage Bohr (1922–2009)
- André Petermann (1922–2011)
- Arthur Wightman (1922–2013)
- Marvin Leonard Goldberger (1922–2014)
- Thomas L. Gilbert (1922–2016)
- Rudolf Haag (1922–2016)
- Cécile DeWitt-Morette (1922–2017)
- Otfried Madelung (1922–2017)
- Emil Wolf (1922–2018)
- George B. Arfken (1922–2020)
- Richard J. Eden (1922–2021)
- Hans Frauenfelder (1922–2022)
- Chen-Ning Yang (1922–2025)
- Bryce DeWitt (1923–2004)
- Christopher Longuet-Higgins (1923–2004)
- Sadao Nakajima (physicist) (1923–2008)
- Alladi Ramakrishnan (1923–2008)
- Harold Lewis (1923–2011)
- Peter A. Wolff (1923–2013)
- Bruno Zumino (1923–2014)
- Lincoln Wolfenstein (1923–2015)
- Henri Cabannes (1923–2016)
- Walter Kohn (1923–2016)
- H. Pierre Noyes (1923–2016)
- Ivor Robinson (1923–2016)
- Spartak Belyaev (1923–2017)
- Laurie Brown (1923–2019)
- Philip Warren Anderson (1923–2020)
- Freeman Dyson (1923–2020)
- Rudolph Pariser (1923–2021)
- Yvonne Choquet-Bruhat (1923–2025)
- Pierre Aigrain (1924–2002)
- Yuri L. Klimontovich (1924–2002)
- Albert Hibbs (1924–2003)
- Amal Kumar Raychaudhuri (1924–2005)
- Evan O'Neill Kane (1924–2006)
- Edwin Ernest Salpeter (1924–2008)
- Frank Buff (1924–2009)
- Benoit Mandelbrot (1924–2010)
- Yuri Viktorovich Novozhilov (1924–2011)
- Yasushi Takahashi (1924–2013)
- Keith Brueckner (1924–2014)
- Ernest M. Henley (1924–2017)
- David Pines (1924–2018)
- Geoffrey Chew (1924–2019)
- Wolfgang Rindler (1924–2019)
- Yuri Orlov (1924–2020)
- Jerald L. Ericksen (1924–2021)
- Suraj N. Gupta (1924–2021)
- Antony Hewish (1924–2021)
- Nicolaas Marinus Hugenholtz (1924–2026)
- Burkhard Heim (1925–2001)
- John Pople (1925–2004)
- Ted Taylor (1925–2004)
- Renfrey Potts (1925–2005)
- John Ziman (1925–2005)
- Richard Dalitz (1925–2006)
- Martin David Kruskal (1925–2006)
- Yuval Ne'eman (1925–2006)
- Albert Overhauser (1925–2011)
- Martin Gutzwiller (1925–2014)
- Norman Rostoker (1925–2014)
- John David Jackson (1925–2016)
- Walter Noll (1925–2017)
- Roy J. Glauber (1925–2018)
- George G. Hall (1925–2018)
- Charles Enz (1925–2019)
- Joshua N. Goldberg (1925–2020)
- Toichiro Kinoshita (1925–2023)
- Nándor Balázs (1926–2003)
- Richard Allan Ferrell (1926–2005)
- Erdal İnönü (1926–2007)
- Karl Rebane (1926–2007)
- Nikolai Borisovich Delone (1926–2008)
- Eugen Fick (1926–2009)
- George Klaus Horton (1926–2009)
- Władysław Świątecki (1926–2009)
- Vladimir Y. Fainberg (1926–2010)
- Allan Sandage (1926–2010)
- Hans-Jürgen Borchers (1926–2011)
- Hajime Mori (1926–2011)
- Gerald E. Brown (1926–2013)
- John Stephen Roy Chisholm (1926–2015)
- Anatoly Logunov (1926–2015)
- Engelbert Schücking (1926–2015)
- Sidney Drell (1926–2016)
- Wojciech Królikowski (1926–2019)
- Viktor P. Silin (1926–2019)
- Rudolf Kippenhahn (1926–2020)
- Jerome K. Percus (1926–2021)
- Boris Ioffe (1926–2022)
- Ben Roy Mottelson (1926–2022)
- Tsung-Dao Lee (1926–2024)
- Kenneth W. Ford (1926–2025)
- Valentin Franke (1926–2025)
- Peter Lax (1926–2025)
- György Marx (1927–2002)
- Eugene Irving Blount (1927–2005)
- Friedrich Beck (1927–2008)
- Stefan Machlup (1927–2008)
- Erhard Scheibe (1927–2010)
- Michel Baranger (1927–2014)
- Walter Thirring (1927–2014)
- Gerald B. Whitham (1927–2014)
- Joseph L. Birman (1927–2016)
- Cyrano de Dominicis (1927–2017)
- Werner Liniger (1927–2017)
- Leon Mestel (1927–2017)
- Elihu Abrahams (1927–2018)
- Desmond King-Hele (1927–2019)
- Michael Woolfson (1927–2019)
- Alf Sjölander (1927–2020)
- Yuri Raizer (1927–2021)
- Eugene Parker (1927–2022)
- Murray Gerstenhaber (1927–2024)
- Hermann Haken (1927–2024)
- Emmanuel Rashba (1927–2025)
- Morrel H. Cohen (born 1927)
- Vladimir I. Ritus (born 1927)
- Sergei Kurdyumov (1928–2004)
- Sergio Fubini (1928–2005)
- Jerzy Plebański (1928–2005)
- Arnold Kosevich (1928–2006)
- Hans-Jürgen Treder (1928–2006)
- Harry L. Frisch (1928–2007)
- Vladimir I. Perel (1928–2007)
- Boris Chirikov (1928–2008)
- Robert Kraichnan (1928–2008)
- Reinhard Oehme (1928–2010)
- Michael Tinkham (1928–2010)
- Robert Brout (1928–2011)
- Anthony Milner Lane (1928–2011)
- István Ozsváth (1928–2013)
- Richard Arnowitt (1928–2014)
- Andrew Sessler (1928–2014)
- Robert Zwanzig (1928–2014)
- Samuel Edwards (1928–2015)
- Felix Pirani (1928–2015)
- Helmut Reik (1928–2015)
- Abner Shimony (1928–2015)
- John W. Cahn (1928–2016)
- Stephen Gasiorowicz (1928–2016)
- Kerson Huang (1928–2016)
- Aloysio Janner (1928–2016)
- Stanley Mandelstam (1928–2016)
- Dmitry Shirkov (1928–2016)
- Wolfhart Zimmermann (1928–2016)
- Alexei Alexeyevich Abrikosov (1928–2017)
- Bertram Kostant (1928–2017)
- Silvan S. Schweber (1928–2017)
- Georg Süßmann (1928–2017)
- Roger Elliott (1928–2018)
- Louis A. Girifalco (1928–2018)
- Yurii Kagan (1928–2019)
- Eyvind Wichmann (1928–2019)
- Robert A. Frosch (1928–2020)
- Alan Lidiard (1928–2020)
- Tatiana Birshteinª (1928–2022)
- John Bryan Taylor (1928–2026)
- Isaac B. Bersuker (born 1928)
- Franco Bassani (1929–2008)
- Robin Bullough (1929–2008)
- Jürgen Ehlers (1929–2008)
- James Philip Elliott (1929–2008)
- Vitaly Shafranov (1929–2014)
- Lev Okun (1929–2015)
- David Finkelstein (1929–2016)
- Lev Gor'kov (1929–2016)
- Philippe Choquard (1929–2018)
- Norman Zabusky (1929–2018)
- Murray Gell-Mann (1929–2019)
- John Slonczewski (1929–2019)
- André Martin (1929–2020)
- Wolfgang Ludwig (1929–2021)
- Ezra T. Newman (1929–2021)
- Kurt Gottfried (1929–2022)
- Asoke Nath Mitra (1929–2022)
- Semyon Gershtein (1929–2023)
- Vladimir Moiseevich Agranovich (1929–2024)
- George B. Field (1929–2024)
- Peter Higgs (1929–2024)
- Joshua Zak (1929–2024)
- Antonino Zichichi (1929–2026)
- Friedwardt Winterberg (born 1929)
- Lars Hedin (1930–2002)
- Bunji Sakita (1930–2002)
- Gerald Grawert (1930–2005)
- Albert Tavkhelidze (1930–2010)
- Vladimir Baier (1930–2010)
- Petr Fomin (1930–2011)
- Thomas Rebane (1930–2012)
- Riazuddin (1930–2013)
- Paul von Ragué Schleyer (1930–2014)
- Marvin D. Girardeau (1930–2015)
- Raymond Stora (1930–2015)
- Susumu Okubo (1930–2015)
- Marvin Chester (1930–2016)
- Mildred Dresselhaus (1930–2017)
- George Herbert Weiss (1930–2017)
- Lodewijk Woltjer (1930–2019)
- Alex Grossmann (1930–2019)
- Richard M. Weiner (1930–2020)
- Akito Arima (1930–2020)
- Gerasim Eliashberg (1930–2021)
- John Polkinghorne (1930–2021)
- David M. Brink (1930–2021)
- Jun Kondo (1930–2022)
- Alberto Sirlin (1930–2022)
- Aleksandr Gurevich (1930–2023)
- Viktor Maslov (1930–2023)
- Leon Cooper (1930–2024)
- Martin Karplus (1930–2024)
- Walter A. Harrison (1930–2024)
- Siegfried Grossmann (1930–2025)
- Volker Heine (born 1930)
- Lawrence Paul Horwitz (born 1930)
- Joel Lebowitz (born 1930)
- Anatoly Nikishov (born 1930)
- John Clayton Taylor (born 1930)
- Fayyazuddin (born 1930)
- Valentina Rebane (1931–2006)
- Valentin Turchin (1931–2010)
- Fedor Kuni (1931–2012)
- Richard Liboff (1931–2014)
- Tullio Regge (1931–2014)
- Wolfgang Weidlich (1931–2015)
- Glen Rebka (1931–2015)
- Vladimir Braginsky* (1931–2016)
- Leonid Keldysh (1931–2016)
- Paul C. Martin (1931–2016)
- Leonid Maksimov (1931–2018)
- George Sudarshan (1931–2018)
- John Robert Schrieffer (1931–2019)
- Loup Verlet (1931–2019)
- Fred Cummings (1931–2019)
- Igor Dzyaloshinskii (1931–2021)
- Michael Fisher (1931–2021)
- Martinus Veltman (1931–2021)
- Polina S. Landa (1931–2022)
- Joachim Schröter (1931–2022)
- Roland Omnès (1931–2022)
- Werner Israel (1931–2022)
- Stanley Deser (1931–2023)
- Michel Gaudin (1931–2023)
- Brian Ridley (1931–2024)
- Icko Iben (1931–2025)
- Luis de la Peña (1931–2026)
- Wolfgang Kundt (born 1931)
- Alexei A. Maradudin (born 1931)
- Mark Nelkin (born 1931)
- Roger Penrose (born 1931)
- Valery Pokrovsky (born 1931)
- Heinrich Hora (born 1931)
- Ian C. Percival (born 1931)
- Anatoly Larkin (1932–2005)
- Radu Bălescu (1932–2006)
- Pierre-Gilles de Gennes (1932–2007)
- Constantin Piron (1932–2012)
- Mario P. Tosi (1932–2015)
- John Murrell (1932–2016)
- Tom Kibble (1932–2016)
- H. Dieter Zeh (1932–2018)
- Yevgeny Avrorin (1932–2018)
- Philip George Burke (1932–2019)
- Mark Azbel (1932–2020)
- Claude Bouchiat (1932–2021)
- Huzihiro Araki (1932–2022)
- Philippe Nozières (1932–2022)
- Imre Gyula Csizmadia (1932–2022)
- Charles W. Misner (1932–2023)
- Rainer K. Sachs (1932–2024)
- John R. Klauder (1932–2024)
- Stuart A. Rice (1932–2024)
- John Boardman (1932–2025)
- François Englert (1932–2026)
- Yakir Aharonov (born 1932)
- Sheldon Glashow (born 1932)
- Elliott H. Lieb (born 1932)
- Roald Sagdeev (born 1932)
- John Dirk Walecka (born 1932)
- Daniel Mattis (born 1932)
- Giovanni Jona-Lasinio (born 1932)
- Alexandr Dykhne (1933–2005)
- Moshe Carmeli (1933–2007)
- Maurice Jacob (1933–2007)
- Alexander Alekseevich Vedenov (1933–2008)
- Yury Izumov (1933–2010)
- John Quinn (1933–2018)
- Steven Weinberg (1933–2021)
- Charles M. Sommerfield (1933–2021)
- Lev Pitaevskii (1933–2022)
- Tai Tsun Wu (1933–2024)
- Ivan Todorov (physicist) (1933–2025)
- Andrzej Trautman (1933–2026)
- Jeffrey Goldstone (1933–2026)
- Roger Balian (born 1933)
- Steven Frautschi (born 1933)
- John Hopfield (born 1933)
- James Charles Phillips (born 1933)
- Gerald Harris Rosen (born 1933)
- Maurice Goldman (born 1933)
- Lluís Bel (born 1933)
- Hans-Arwed Weidenmüller (born 1933)
- Joshua Jortner (born 1933)
- Victor Emery (1934–2002)
- Chen Chunxian (1934–2004)
- Julius Wess (1934–2007)
- Evgenii Maksimov (1934–2011)
- Manuel Cardona (1934–2014)
- Marcel Froissart (1934–2015)
- Moo-Young Han (1934–2016)
- Ludvig Faddeev (1934–2017)
- Pierre Hohenberg (1934–2017)
- Hao Bailin (1934–2018)
- Michael Nauenberg (1934–2019)
- David J. Thouless (1934–2019)
- Miron Amusia (1934–2021)
- Hiranmay Sen Gupta (1934–2022)
- Morton Gurtin (1934–2022)
- Jacques Villain (1934–2022)
- Rodney Loudon (1934–2022)
- Lowell Brown (1934–2023)
- James Bjorken (1934–2024)
- Sebastian Doniach (born 1934)
- John G. Cramer (born 1934)
- Albert Schwarz (born 1934)
- Fred Alan Wolf (born 1934)
- Roy Kerr (born 1934)
- James S. Langer (born 1934)
- George Zaslavsky (1935–2008)
- Nicola Cabibbo (1935–2010)
- Keiji Kikkawa (1935–2013)
- Walter Greiner (1935–2016)
- Oktay Sinanoğlu (1935–2015)
- Giancarlo Ghirardi (1935–2018)
- Donald Lynden-Bell (1935–2018)
- Pierre Sabatier (1935–2023)
- Evgeny Velikhov (1935–2024)
- Hugh Burkhardt (1935–2024)
- Joseph H. Eberly (1935–2025)
- Basil Hiley (1935–2025)
- Carl H. Brans (1935–2026)
- Francesco Calogero (1935–2026)
- Gordon Baym (born 1935)
- Marvin L. Cohen (born 1935)
- Richard M. Friedberg (born 1935)
- Hanoch Gutfreund (born 1935)
- N. David Mermin (born 1935)
- Harald J.W. Mueller-Kirsten (born 1935)
- Igor Dmitriyevich Novikov (born 1935)
- Askold M. Perelomov (born 1935)
- David Ruelle (born 1935)
- Yakov Sinai (born 1935)
- Herbert Wagner (born 1935)
- David Fairlie (born 1935)
- Jim Peebles (born 1935)
- Mikhail Braun (born 1935)
- Guy Laval (born 1935)
- A. Brooks Harris (born 1935)
- Bruno Coppi (born 1935)
- Dieter Flamm (1936–2002)
- Gert Eilenberger (1936–2010)
- Kenneth G. Wilson (1936–2013)
- Gerald Guralnik (1936–2014)
- Ted Janssen (1936–2017)
- Peter Freund (1936–2018)
- Leonid A. Falkovsky (1936–2020)
- Alexander Patashinski (1936–2020)
- Jean-Loup Gervais (1936–2020)
- Abdul Qadeer Khan (1936–2021)
- Pavel Winternitz (1936–2021)
- Hans Capel (1936–2023)
- Peter Fulde (1936–2024)
- Arno Bohm (1936–2024)
- Robert W. Fuller (1936–2025)
- Werner Ebeling (physicist) (born 1936)
- Klaus Hepp (born 1936)
- Rudolf Muradyan (born 1936)
- William G. Hoover (born 1936)
- Noor Muhammad Butt (born 1936)
- Ray Streater (born 1936)
- Trần Thanh Vân (born 1936)
- Ian Aitchison (born 1936)
- Mannque Rho (born 1936)
- Michał Heller (born 1936)
- John Strathdee (born 1936)
- James T. Cushing (1937–2002)
- Eduard Prugovečki (1937–2003)
- Praveen Chaudhari (1937–2007)
- Sidney Coleman (1937–2007)
- Vladimir Arnold (1937–2010)
- David Olive (1937–2012)
- Oriol Bohigas Martí (1937–2013)
- Leo Kadanoff (1937–2015)
- Vadim Kuzmin (1937–2015)
- Dietrich Kremp (1937–2017)
- Jill Bonner (1937–2021)
- Wolfgang Götze (1937–2021)
- Gerald Mahan (1937–2021)
- Pantur Silaban (1937–2022)
- Jozef T. Devreese (1937–2023)
- Iosif Khriplovich (1937–2024)
- Alexander Fetter (born 1937)
- C. R. Hagen (born 1937)
- Leonid Pastur (born 1937)
- Tung-Mow Yan (born 1937)
- George Zweig (born 1937)
- Arthur Jaffe (born 1937)
- Gordon L. Kane (born 1937)
- Alan Martin (born 1937)
- Marcel Guénin (born 1937)
- He Xiantu (born 1937)
- Alexander Ovchinnikov (1938–2003)
- Mikhail Petrovich Rekalo (1938–2004)
- Franz Schwabl (1938–2009)
- Balázs Győrffy (1938–2012)
- C. V. Vishveshwara (1938–2017)
- Jean Ginibre (1938–2020)
- Neil Ashcroft (1938–2021)
- Andrzej Kossakowski (1938–2021)
- Sergei Novikov (1938–2024)
- Daniel I. Khomskii (1938–2024)
- A. P. Balachandran (1938–2025)
- Jayant Narlikar (1938–2025)
- Anthony James Leggett (1938–2026)
- Alexander Animalu (born 1938)
- Boris Arbuzov (born 1938)
- Édouard Brézin (born 1938)
- Vitaly Efimov (born 1938)
- Alexei L. Efros (born 1938)
- Vladimir P. Krainov (born 1938)
- Peter van Nieuwenhuizen (born 1938)
- Leonard Parker (born 1938)
- Lu Jeu Sham (born 1938)
- Heinrich Leutwyler (born 1938)
- Vernon Barger (born 1938)
- Vadym Adamyan (born 1938)
- Frédéric Pham (born 1938)
- Boris Struminsky (1939–2003)
- Yurii Dmitriev 1939–2012)
- Roger Cowley (1939–2015)
- Yoseph Imry (1939–2018)
- Ratko Janev (1939–2019)
- Giuseppe Pastori Parravicini (1939–2019)
- Ratko Janev (1939–2019)
- Erasmo Recami (1939–2021)
- James M. Bardeen (1939–2022)
- Andrei Slavnov (1939–2022)
- Antonio Fernández Rañada (1939–2022)
- Roman Jackiw (1939–2023)
- Vladimir E. Zakharov (1939–2023)
- Alexander Andreev (1939–2023)
- Gérard Toulouse (1939–2023)
- James Hartle (1939–2023)
- Mary K. Gaillard (1939–2025)
- Kenneth Nordtvedt (1939–2025)
- Ramamurti Rajaraman (1939–2025)
- Carlo Becchi (1939–2025)
- Stephen L. Adler (born 1939)
- Daniel Z. Freedman (born 1939)
- Pran Nath (born 1939)
- Marlan Scully (born 1939)
- George F. R. Ellis (born 1939)
- Stuart S. Antman (born 1939)
- Sergio Albeverio (born 1939)
- Goéry Delacôte (born 1939)
- Jack Sarfatti (born 1939)
- Alfred Mueller (born 1939)
- Marek Demiański (born 1939)
- Eric Jakeman (born 1939)
- Ajoy Ghatak (born 1939)
- Alexander Nikolaevich Vasiliev (1940–2006)
- Stanley Martin Flatté (1940–2007)
- Bohdan Paczyński (1940–2007)
- Francisco José Ynduráin (1940–2008)
- Alexei Fridman (1940–2010)
- Floris Takens (1940–2010)
- Stanislav Mikheyev (1940–2011)
- Marshall Stoneham (1940–2011)
- Oscar Lanford (1940–2013)
- Emilio Del Giudice (1940–2014)
- Eduard A. Kuraev (1940–2014)
- Lev Lipatov (1940–2017)
- Helen Freedhoff (1940–2017)
- Narendra Kumar (1940–2017)
- Edward Tryon (1940–2019)
- Toshihide Maskawa (1940–2021)
- Miguel Ángel Virasoro (1940–2021)
- Göran Lindblad (1940–2022)
- Rodney Baxter (1940–2025)
- Igor Tyutin (1940–2026)
- Michael L. Klein (born 1940)
- Stanley Brodsky (born 1940)
- Juansher Chkareuli (born 1940)
- Mikhail Dyakonov (born 1940)
- Eleftherios Economou (born 1940)
- Uriel Frisch (born 1940)
- Peter Grassberger (born 1940)
- Göran Grimvall (born 1940)
- Haim Harari (born 1940)
- John Iliopoulos (born 1940)
- Brian Josephson (born 1940)
- Dmitri Ryutov (born 1940)
- Leonard Susskind (born 1940)
- Kip Thorne (born 1940)
- Valentin Ivanovich Zakharov (born 1940)
- Alan Harold Luther (born 1940)
- Jean-Marc Lévy-Leblond (born 1940)
- Harald Böttger (born 1940)
- Franz Wegner (born 1940)
- Bülent Atalay (born 1940)
- Vladimir Baryshevsky (born 1940)
- Robert Delbourgo (born 1940)
- Fred Gilman (born 1940)
- Barry M. McCoy (born 1940)
- Abdullah Sadiq (born 1940)
- Roy G. Gordon (born 1940)
- Brosl Hasslacher (1941–2005)
- Guido Altarelli (1941–2015)
- Ronald C. Davidson (1941–2016)
- William A. Bardeen (1941–2025)
- Peter Minkowski (1941–2025)
- Thomas Appelquist (born 1941)
- Vladimir Belinski (born 1941)
- Michael Berry (born 1941)
- Cecilia Jarlskog (born 1941)
- David Gross (born 1941)
- Bertrand Halperin (born 1941)
- Luciano Maiani (born 1941)
- Jeffrey Mandula (born 1941)
- Holger Bech Nielsen (born 1941)
- Peter Pulay (born 1941)
- T. V. Ramakrishnan (born 1941)
- John Henry Schwarz (born 1941)
- Nelly Pavlovna Konopleva (born 1941)
- Arun Kumar Basak (born 1941)
- Philip Bunker (born 1941)
- David Sherrington (born 1941)
- Bruce McKellar (born 1941)
- Douglas Gough (born 1941)
- Frank A. Weinhold (born 1941)
- Jerrold E. Marsden (1942–2010)
- Stephen Hawking (1942–2018)
- Eugène Cremmer (1942–2019)
- Roberto Peccei (1942–2020)
- Konrad Osterwalder (1942–2025)
- Michael Shur (1942–2026)
- Alexander Belavin (born 1942)
- Curtis Callan (born 1942)
- Victor Sergeevich Fadin (born 1942)
- Crispin Gardiner (born 1942)
- Robert Geroch (born 1942)
- David J. Griffiths (born 1942)
- Yves Pomeau (born 1942)
- Alain Rouet (born 1942)
- Arkady Vainshtein (born 1942)
- Gabriele Veneziano (born 1942)
- Michael C. Reed (born 1942)
- Martin Rees (born 1942)
- Brandon Carter (born 1942)
- Paolo Di Vecchia (born 1942)
- Ganesan Srinivasan (born 1942)
- Jeffrey Bub (born 1942)
- Victor Fadin (born 1942)
- Christopher J. Pethick (born 1942)
- Christopher Llewellyn Smith (born 1942)
- George Chapline Jr. (born 1942)
- Martin B. Einhorn (born 1942)
- Francesco Iachello (born 1942)
- Ephraim Fischbach (born 1942)
- Robert Graham (born 1942)
- Peter Wölfle (born 1942)
- Masud Ahmad (1943–2018)
- Petr Braun (1943–2020)
- Lars Brink (1943–2022)
- Harald Fritzsch (1943–2022)
- Amnon Aharony (born 1943)
- V. Balakrishnan (born 1943)
- Carl M. Bender (born 1943)
- Charles Bennett (born 1943)
- Paul Frampton (born 1943)
- Renata Kallosh (born 1943)
- J. Michael Kosterlitz (born 1943)
- John Perdew (born 1943)
- Richard H. Price (born 1943)
- Pierre Ramond (born 1943)
- Rashid Sunyaev (born 1943)
- Erio Tosatti (born 1943)
- Jean Zinn-Justin (born 1943)
- Helen Quinn (born 1943)
- Davison Soper (born 1943)
- Bryan Webber (born 1943)
- Odile Macchi (born 1943)
- John F. Gunion (born 1943)
- Itzhak Bars (born 1943)
- Robin Devenish (born 1943)
- Richard Kerner (born 1943)
- Che-Ming Ko (born 1943)
- Joseph L. McCauley (born 1943)
- Ryszard Horodecki (born 1943)
- Jerzy Juliusz Kijowski (born 1943)
- Barry Holstein (born 1943)
- Tom Lubensky (born 1943)
- John Pendry (born 1943)
- Mitchell Feigenbaum (1944–2019)
- Boris Zon (1944–2020)
- Graham Ross (1944–2021)
- Kurt Binder (1944–2022)
- Dionys Baeriswyl (1944–2023)
- Makoto Kobayashi (born 1944)
- Alexander Kuzemsky (born 1944)
- Rabindra Mohapatra (born 1944)
- Anthony Ichiro Sanda (born 1944)
- Boris Shklovskii (born 1944)
- Michael Thorpe (born 1944)
- Françoise Brochard-Wyart (born 1944)
- Luigi Lugiato (born 1944)
- Chris Quigg (born 1944)
- Riccardo Barbieri (born 1944)
- Detlev Buchholz (born 1944)
- Michael Creutz (born 1944)
- Peter Finke (born 1944)
- Jean-Pierre Eckmann (born 1944)
- Andrew J. Hanson (born 1944)
- Leo Radom (born 1944)
- Henry F. Schaefer III (born 1944)
- John W. Negele (born 1944)
- Harald Grosse (born 1944)
- Christopher Isham (born 1944)
- Rod Crewther (1945–2020)
- Joel Primack (1945–2025)
- Sergio Ferrara (born 1945)
- Peter Goddard (born 1945)
- Hajo Leschke (born 1945)
- Alexander Migdal (born 1945)
- Michele Parrinello (born 1945)
- Alexander Markovich Polyakov (born 1945)
- Nikolai Shakura (born 1945)
- Israel Michael Sigal (born 1945)
- W. G. Unruh (born 1945)
- Bernard de Wit (born 1945)
- Jakob Yngvason (born 1945)
- Anthony Zee (born 1945)
- Stephen A. Fulling (born 1945)
- John Kogut (born 1945)
- Igor Batalin (born 1945)
- Vladimir Petrovich Mineev (born 1945)
- Carsten Peterson (born 1945)
- Loran Adzhemyan (born 1945)
- Metin Gürses (born 1945)
- Reinhold Bertlmann (born 1945)
- Frank Close (born 1945)
- Ronald Mallett (born 1945)
- Jiří Horáček (born 1945)
- Craig Tracy (born 1945)
- Józef Spałek (born 1945)
- Paul Chaikin (born 1945)
- Jerry Tersoff (born 1945)
- David Wallace (born 1945)
- Gennady Chibisov (1946–2008)
- Viacheslav Belavkin (1946–2012)
- Vladimir Fortov (1946–2020)
- Lorenz S. Cederbaum (born 1946)
- İsmail Hakkı Duru (born 1946)
- Michael Green (born 1946)
- Gerardus 't Hooft (born 1946)
- André Neveu (born 1946)
- Charles Thorn (born 1946)
- Grigory E. Volovik (born 1946)
- Gregory A. Vilkovisky (born 1946)
- Jean-Bernard Zuber (born 1946)
- Barry Simon (born 1946)
- Gary Gibbons (born 1946)
- Eli Yablonovitch (born 1946)
- Jürg Fröhlich (born 1946)
- Thomas Spencer (born 1946)
- Galina Shpatakovskaya (born 1946)
- George Sterman (born 1946)
- Herbert Spohn (born 1946)
- Clifford Martin Will (born 1946)
- Bernard F. Schutz (born 1946)
- Alexander Petrashen (born 1946)
- John Ellis (born 1946)
- Robert Jaffe (born 1946)
- Estia J. Eichten (born 1946)
- Jean Bellissard (born 1946)
- Andrzej Buras (born 1946)
- Paul Davies (born 1946)
- John Harnad (born 1946)
- Andrzej Jamiołkowski (born 1946)
- Evgenii Likhtman (born 1946)
- Jacques Prost (born 1946)
- Patrick A. Lee (born 1946)
- Debashis Mukherjee (born 1946)
- Valeri Frolov (born 1946)
- William E. Caswell (1947–2001)
- Nathan Isgur (1947–2001)
- Alexander Pavlovich Grinin (1947–2006)
- Jacob Bekenstein (1947–2015)
- John Joannopoulos (1947–2025)
- Claudio Bunster (born 1947)
- Roberto Car (born 1947)
- John Cardy (born 1947)
- Howard Georgi (born 1947)
- Alan Guth (born 1947)
- Michio Kaku (born 1947)
- Walter Selke (born 1947)
- Robert Shekhter (born 1947)
- Henry Tye (born 1947)
- Robert Wald (born 1947)
- Erick Weinberg (born 1947)
- Anna N. Żytkow (born 1947)
- Ulf Lindström (born 1947)
- Denis Gratias (born 1947)
- Stuart L. Shapiro (born 1947)
- Ikaros Bigi (born 1947)
- William Marciano (born 1947)
- Hans Dekker (born 1947)
- Celso Grebogi (born 1947)
- Alex Hankey (born 1947)
- Ricardo Galvão (born 1947)
- Saul Teukolsky (born 1947)
- Andrew King (born 1947)
- Douglas C. Heggie (born 1947)
- Alexei Starobinsky (1948–2023)
- Thomas Curtright (born 1948)
- Gabor Forgacs (born 1948)
- Eugene Levich (born 1948)
- Andrei Linde (born 1948)
- Dimitri Nanopoulos (born 1948)
- Don Page (born 1948)
- Giorgio Parisi (born 1948)
- Douglas Ross (born 1948)
- Michael F. Shlesinger (born 1948)
- Georgy Shlyapnikov (born 1948)
- Toshiki Tajima (born 1948)
- Vladimir Tikhonchuk (born 1948)
- Bennie Ward (born 1948)
- Anne Boutet de Monvel (born 1948)
- Pierre Collet (born 1948)
- Tamás Vicsek (born 1948)
- Daniel Friedan (born 1948)
- Theo Geisel (born 1948)
- Mikhail Sadovskii (born 1948)
- Shaul Mukamel (born 1948)
- Alexander Smits (born 1948)
- Dmitry Igorevich Dyakonov (1949–2012)
- Walter Thiel (1949–2019)
- Andrey Kronidovich Kazansky (1949–2023)
- Nihat Berker (born 1949)
- Tekin Dereli (born 1949)
- Ayşe Erzan (born 1949)
- Alexander Grosberg (born 1949)
- Steven Gwon Sheng Louie (born 1949)
- Richard G. Palmer (born 1949)
- Hugh David Politzer (born 1949)
- Itamar Procaccia (born 1949)
- Mikhail Shifman (born 1949)
- Alexander Vilenkin (born 1949)
- Joel Feldman (born 1949)
- John C. Collins (born 1949)
- R. Keith Ellis (born 1949)
- Abhay Ashtekar (born 1949)
- Shing-Tung Yau (born 1949)
- Pierre Fayet (born 1949)
- Pierre Sikivie (born 1949)
- Tom Banks (born 1949)
- Willy Fischler (born 1949)
- Mary Hudson (born 1949)
- Martin Lüscher (born 1949)
- Werner Nahm (born 1949)
- Annette Zippelius (born 1949)
- Larry D. McLerran (born 1949)
- Michael Duff (born 1949)
- Roger Blandford (born 1949)
- James E. Pringle (born 1949)
- Konstantin Efetov (1950–2021)
- Carlton M. Caves (born 1950)
- Sylvester James Gates (born 1950)
- Robert B. Laughlin (born 1950)
- Berndt Müller (born 1950)
- Stephen Parke (born 1950)
- Johann Rafelski (born 1950)
- Goran Senjanovic (born 1950)
- Kyriakos Tamvakis (born 1950)
- Steven Girvin (born 1950)
- James Binney (born 1950)
- Amir Caldeira (born 1950)
- Sergiu Klainerman (born 1950)
- Louise Dolan (born 1950)
- Thors Hans Hansson (born 1950)
- Monique Combescure (born 1950)
- Matt Visser (born 1950)
- Peter Hänggi (born 1950)
- B. Sriram Shastry (born 1950)
- Howard Carmichael (born 1950)
- Eduardo Fradkin (born 1950)
- Hisham Ghassib (born 1950)
- Ravi Gomatam (born 1950)
- Eugene J. Mele (born 1950)
- Spenta R. Wadia (born 1950)
- Dick Bond (born 1950)
- Shuichi Nosé (1951–2005)
- Demetrios Christodoulou (born 1951)
- Ignazio Ciufolini (born 1951)
- Thibault Damour (born 1951)
- F. Duncan Haldane (born 1951)
- Christopher T. Hill (born 1951)
- Allan H. MacDonald (born 1951)
- Alexei Smirnov (born 1951)
- Frank Wilczek (born 1951)
- Edward Witten (born 1951)
- Cosmas Zachos (born 1951)
- Wojciech H. Zurek (born 1951)
- Philip Candelas (born 1951)
- Michael Peskin (born 1951)
- Denis Evans (born 1951)
- Yuri Dokshitzer (born 1951)
- Tin-Lun Ho (born 1951)
- Edward Kolb (born 1951)
- H. R. Krishnamurthy (born 1951)
- Vladimir Korepin (born 1951)
- Eugene Trubowitz (born 1951)
- Dieter Vollhardt (born 1951)
- Deepak Dhar (born 1951)
- David Robert Nelson (born 1951)
- Mujahid Kamran (born 1951)
- Carlos Frenk (born 1951)
- John Hannay (born 1951)
- Alexei Zamolodchikov (1952–2007)
- John D. Barrow (1952–2020)
- Ian Affleck (1952–2024)
- Bernard Derrida (born 1952)
- Paul Steinhardt (born 1952)
- Horst Stöcker (born 1952)
- Christof Wetterich (born 1952)
- Alexander Zamolodchikov (born 1952)
- Peter Zoller (born 1952)
- Savas Dimopoulos (born 1952)
- Gerard Peter Lepage (born 1952)
- Bernard Julia (born 1952)
- Patrick Mora (born 1952)
- Nathalie Deruelle (born 1952)
- Ian Hinchliffe (born 1952)
- Howard E. Haber (born 1952)
- Paul Wiegmann (born 1952)
- Edward Farhi (born 1952)
- Dharam Vir Ahluwalia (born 1952)
- Lars Bergström (born 1952)
- Stefan Karol Estreicher (born 1952)
- Gunnar Ingelman (born 1952)
- Warren Siegel (born 1952)
- Hermann Nicolai (born 1952)
- Igor Frenkel (born 1952)
- Muhammad Suhail Zubairy (born 1952)
- Tim Palmer (born 1952)
- Tony Bell (born 1952)
- James Stirling (1953–2018)
- Mikhail Voloshin (1953–2020)
- Stephan W. Koch (1953–2022)
- Mark B. Wise (1953–2026)
- Ali Chamseddine (born 1953)
- David Deutsch (born 1953)
- Boris Feigin (born 1953)
- Eberhard Gross (born 1953)
- John Preskill (born 1953)
- Stuart Samuel (born 1953)
- Sankar Das Sarma (born 1953)
- Daniel L. Stein (born 1953)
- José W. F. Valle (born 1953)
- Peter Guy Wolynes (born 1953)
- Richard Jozsa (born 1953)
- Marie Farge (born 1953)
- Michael Dine (born 1953)
- Stephen Shenker (born 1953)
- Diederik Aerts (born 1953)
- Steve Carlip (born 1953)
- Berthold-Georg Englert (born 1953)
- George M. Fuller (born 1953)
- Horst Knörrer (born 1953)
- Gordon Walter Semenoff (born 1953)
- Luc Vinet (born 1953)
- Fritz Gesztesy (born 1953)
- Steven Balbus (born 1953)
- Joseph Polchinski (1954–2018)
- Ashton Baldwin Carter (1954–2022)
- David A. Shapiro (1954–2025)
- Alexandre Bouzdine (born 1954)
- Mikhail Feigelman (born 1954)
- Alexey Khokhlov (born 1954)
- Lawrence M. Krauss (born 1954)
- Michael Loss (born 1954)
- David Vanderbilt (born 1954)
- Julia Yeomans (born 1954)
- Barton Zwiebach (born 1954)
- Clifford Taubes (born 1954)
- Antti Kupiainen (born 1954)
- F. J. Duarte (born 1954)
- Reinhard F. Werner (born 1954)
- Leonard Mlodinow (born 1954)
- Torbjörn Sjöstrand (born 1954)
- Serge Rudaz (born 1954)
- Ted Jacobson (born 1954)
- Martin Roček (born 1954)
- Steven Kivelson (born 1954)
- Chris H. Greene (born 1954)
- A. Douglas Stone (born 1954)
- Andrey Smigla (born 1954)
- Pierre Binétruy (1955–2017)
- Jonathan Dowling (1955–2020)
- Valery Rubakov (1955–2022)
- Peter Littlewood (1955–2026)
- Boris Altshuler (born 1955)
- Dietrich Belitz (born 1955)
- Gilles Brassard (born 1955)
- Augusto Sagnotti (born 1955)
- Lee Smolin (born 1955)
- Alan Sokal (born 1955)
- Andrew Strominger (born 1955)
- Jeffrey A. Harvey (born 1955)
- Vincent Rivasseau (born 1955)
- Sally Dawson (born 1955)
- Paul Ginsparg (born 1955)
- Luis Álvarez-Gaumé (born 1955)
- Ignatios Antoniadis (born 1955)
- Maciej Lewenstein (born 1955)
- Gary Horowitz (born 1955)
- John Toner (born 1955)
- Gilles Chabrier (born 1955)
- George Efstathiou (born 1955)
- Mark Srednicki (born 1955)
- Zlatko Tesanovic (1956–2012)
- A. M. Jayannavar (1956–2021)
- Assa Auerbach (1956–2025)
- Kurt Kremer (born 1956)
- David Lindley (born 1956)
- Dieter Lüst (born 1956)
- Fulvio Melia (born 1956)
- Viatcheslav Mukhanov (born 1956)
- Carlo Rovelli (born 1956)
- Susan M. Scottª (born 1956)
- Nathan Seiberg (born 1956)
- Ashoke Sen (born 1956)
- Sunil Mukhi (born 1956)
- Sheldon Katz (born 1956)
- Boris Shraiman (born 1956)
- Daniel S. Fisher (born 1956)
- Karen Barad (born 1956)
- Eric D'Hoker (born 1956)
- Doron Gepner (born 1956)
- Fernando Quevedo (born 1956)
- Ashoke Sen (born 1956)
- Robert Brandenberger (born 1956)
- Arkady Tseytlin (born 1956)
- Sandu Popescu (born 1956)
- John Chalker (born 1956)
- Clark R. Landis (born 1956)
- Lev Kofman (1957–2009)
- Thanu Padmanabhan (1957–2021)
- Alexander Shchekin (1957–2023)
- Mehran Kardar (born 1957)
- Mikhail Katsnelson (born 1957)
- Joseph Lykken (born 1957)
- Marc Mézard (born 1957)
- Peter Woit (born 1957)
- Ryan Rohm (born 1957)
- Wolfgang P. Schleich (born 1957)
- Mark Bowick (born 1957)
- Gabriel Kotliar (born 1957)
- Jean-Baptiste Leblond (born 1957)
- Chris Hull (born 1957)
- Ann Nelson (1958–2019)
- Piers Coleman (born 1958)
- David Tannor (born 1958)
- Neil Turok (born 1958)
- Giovanni Felder (born 1958)
- Nicolai Reshetikhin (born 1958)
- Emil Martinec (born 1958)
- Étienne Klein (born 1958)
- John Wheater (born 1958)
- David A. Huse (born 1958)
- David B. Kaplan (born 1958)
- Martin Zirnbauer (born 1958)
- Mohit Randeria (born 1958)
- T. N. Venkataramana (born 1958)
- José Onuchic (born 1958)
- Nicholas Read (born 1958)
- Dov Levine (born 1958)
- Kirill Zybin (born 1958)
- Jerzy Lewandowski (1959–2024)
- Erich Runge (born 1959)
- Stephen Wolfram (born 1959)
- Steven R. White (born 1959)
- Horng-Tzer Yau (born 1959)
- Orfeu Bertolami (born 1959)
- Andrey V. Chubukov (born 1959)
- Miguel Ángel Fernández Sanjuán (born 1959)
- Anamaría Font (born 1959)
- Boris Svistunov (born 1959)
- Anamaría Font (born 1959)
- Jorge Kurchan (born 1959)
- Claudia Draxl (born 1959)
- Raymond Laflamme (1960–2025)
- Carlo Beenakker (born 1960)
- David Drabold (born 1960)
- Cumrun Vafa (born 1960)
- Zvi Bern (born 1960)
- Stéphane Roux (born 1960)
- Seth Lloyd (born 1960)
- William Bialek (born 1960)
- Howard A. Stone (born 1960)
- Charles Meneveau (born 1960)
- Jainendra K. Jain (born 1960)
- Robert Myers (born 1960)
- Richard Cleve (born 1960)
- Ady Stern (born 1960)
- Matthew P. A. Fisher (born 1960)
- Serguei Krasnikov (1961–2024)
- John C. Baez (born 1961)
- Jacques Distler (born 1961)
- Michael R. Douglas (born 1961)
- Gian F. Giudice (born 1961)
- Maksim Kagan (born 1961)
- Subir Sachdev (born 1961)
- Erik Verlinde (born 1961)
- Xiao-Gang Wen (born 1961)
- Antoine Georges (born 1961)
- Jan Philip Solovej (born 1961)
- Lance J. Dixon (born 1961)
- Artur Ekert (born 1961)
- Nigel Glover (born 1961)
- Murray Batchelor (born 1961)
- Anna Ceresole (born 1961)
- Matthew Choptuik (born 1961)
- Gian Francesco Giudice (born 1961)
- Michael Cates (born 1961)
- Krzysztof Antoni Meissner (born 1961)
- Karin M. Rabe (born 1961)
- Shivaji Sondhi (born 1961)
- Greg Moore (born 1961)
- Raymond E. Goldstein (born 1961)
- Monika Ritsch-Marte (born 1961)
- Paul Halpern (born 1961)
- Jean-Philippe Bouchaud (born 1962)
- Marcela Carena (born 1962)
- Igor Klebanov (born 1962)
- Lisa Randallª (born 1962)
- Carlos E.M. Wagner (born 1962)
- Ezra Getzler (born 1962)
- Mark Alford (born 1962)
- Brian Greene (born 1962)
- Gian Michele Graf (born 1962)
- Hirosi Ooguri (born 1962)
- Peter Gill (born 1962)
- Xiangdong Ji (born 1962)
- Helmut Ritsch (born 1962)
- Shoucheng Zhang (1963–2018)
- Alexei Kitaev (born 1963)
- Sandip Trivedi (born 1963)
- Thierry Giamarchi (born 1963)
- Joseph Kouneiher (born 1963)
- Sergej Flach (born 1963)
- Petr Hořava (born 1963)
- Sudhir Ranjan Jain (born 1963)
- Charles L. Kane (born 1963)
- Detlef Lohse (born 1963)
- Cristiane de Morais Smith (born 1964)
- Gia Dvali (born 1964)
- Miguel Alcubierre (born 1964)
- Raman Sundrum (born 1964)
- Lars Bildsten (born 1964)
- Antonio H. Castro Neto (born 1964)
- Ursula Röthlisberger (born 1964)
- Pinaki Majumdar (born 1964)
- Ángel Rubio (born 1965)
- Antony Valentini (born 1965)
- Leticia Cugliandolo (born 1965)
- Christopher Jarzynski (born 1965)
- Nicolas J. Cerf (born 1965)
- Rinat Kedem (born 1965)
- Ignacio Cirac (born 1965)
- Andrew Fisher (born 1965)
- Andrew Steane (born 1965)
- Sean M. Carroll (born 1966)
- Stephen Hsu (born 1966)
- Matthias Gaberdiel (born 1966)
- Lucien Hardy (born 1966)
- Martin Beneke (born 1966)
- Manindra Agrawal (born 1966)
- Christof Gattringer (born 1966)
- Durmus A. Demir (born 1967)
- João Magueijo (born 1967)
- Rajesh Gopakumar (born 1967)
- Andrej Arbuzov (born 1967)
- Mustapha Ishak Boushaki (born 1967)
- Rajesh Gopakumar (born 1967)
- Anna Krylov (born 1967)
- Natalia Berloff (born 1968)
- Jeff Forshaw (born 1968)
- Antony Garrett Lisi (born 1968)
- Juan Maldacena (born 1968)
- Jeroen van den Brink (born 1968)
- Pedro G. Ferreira (born 1968)
- Wolfgang Fink (born 1968)
- Marina Huerta (born 1968)
- Gabriel Martinez-Pinedo (born 1968)
- Alessandra Buonanno (born 1968)
- Matthias Troyer (born 1968)
- Martin Bodo Plenio (born 1968)
- Clifford V. Johnson (born 1968)
- Vijay Balasubramanian (born 1969)
- Laura Mersini-Houghtonª (born 1969)
- Dam Thanh Son (born 1969)
- Nicola Spaldin (born 1969)
- Kenneth Ruud (born 1969)
- Shamit Kachru (born 1970)
- Eva Silverstein (born 1970)
- Daniel Gottesman (born 1970)
- Hubert Bray (born 1970)
- Abhishek Dhar (born 1970)
- Horacio Casini (born 1970)
- Gerald Teschl (born 1970)
- Mikhail Lukin (born 1971)
- Vlatko Vedral (born 1971)
- Anton Kapustin (born 1971)
- Dean Lee (born 1971)
- Raphael Bousso (born 1971)
- Paweł Horodecki (born 1971)
- Eugene Demler (born 1971)
- Leticia González (born 1971)
- Matias Zaldarriaga (born 1971)
- Steven Gubser (1972–2019)
- Nima Arkani-Hamed (born 1972)
- Shiraz Minwalla (born 1972)
- Gavin Salam (born 1972)
- Shanhui Fan (born 1972)
- Maxim Chernodub (born 1973)
- Luboš Motl (born 1973)
- Cédric Villani (born 1973)
- Tommy Ohlsson (born 1973)
- Ashvin Vishwanath (born 1973)
- Egor Babaev (born 1973)
- Nikita Nekrasov (born 1973)
- Yuri Kovchegov (born 1973)
- Terry Rudolph (born 1973)
- Michał Horodecki (born 1973)
- Mark Van Raamsdonk (born 1973)
- Aurélien Barrau (born 1973)
- Steven G. Johnson (born 1973)
- Yasunori Nomura (born 1974)
- Lisa Dyson (born 1974)
- Hiranya Peiris (born 1974)
- Nikodem Popławski (born 1975)
- Brian Wecht (born 1975)
- Rembert Duine (born 1975)
- Eun-Ah Kim (born 1975)
- Vyacheslav Rychkov (born 1975)
- Barbara Kraus (born 1975)
- Robert Seiringer (born 1976)
- Anastasia Volovich (born 1976)
- Florent Krzakala (born 1976)
- Alexandra Olaya-Castro (born 1976)
- Bianca Dittrichª (born 1977)
- Davide Gaiotto (born 1977)
- Adam Rycerz (born 1977)
- Yasaman Farzan (born 1977)
- Shinsei Ryu (born 1977)
- Niklas Beisert (born 1977)
- Davide Gaiotto (born 1977)
- Bogdan Andrei Bernevig (born 1978)
- Matthieu Wyart (born 1978)
- Claudia de Rham (born 1978)
- Andrzej Dragan (born 1978)
- Jo Dunkley (born 1979)
- Katie Mack (born 1981)
- Adolfo del Campo (born 1981)
- Simon Devitt (born 1981)
- Pedro Vieira (born 1982)
- Zohar Komargodski (born 1983)
- Xi Yin (born 1984)
- Simon Caron-Huot (born 1984)
- Mikhail Lemeshko (born 1985)
- Bernhard Mistlberger (born 1987)
- Netta Engelhardt (born 1988)
- Vedika Khemani (born 1988)
- Nikolas Breuckmann (born 1988)
- Sabrina Gonzalez Pasterski (born 1993)
- Alan Kostelecky
- K. S. Babu
- Guy de Téramond Peralta
- Kathryn Zurek
- David Berenstein
- Ruth Britto
- Kenneth Lane
- Ayana Holloway Arce
- Clare Burrage
- Freddy Cachazo
- Xie Chen
- Emily S. C. Ching
- Csaba Csáki
- Elbio Dagotto
- Anne-Christine Davis
- Sebastian Deffner
- Dejan Milošević
- Emanuela Del Gado
- Peter D. Jarvis
- Bogdan A. Dobrescu
- Joakim Edsjö
- Victor Galitski
- Graciela Gelmini
- Lawrence John Hall
- Anne Schilling
- Mina Aganagić
- Kathryn Levin
- Erica Carlson
- Ganapathy Baskaran
- Erin Johnson
- Gail McLaughlin
- Aditi Mitra
- Yanqin Wu
- Amer Iqbal
- Douglas Stanford
- Mike Payne
- Michael Finnis
- Michael Gillan
- Stephen M. Barnett
- James Sauls
- Cathie Clarke
- Monika Mościbrodzka
- Benjamin Simons
- Ruth Gregory
- Meera Parish
- Clare Burrage
- Hannah Price
- Katy Clough

== Fictional theoretical physicists ==
- Gordon Freeman
- Eli Vance
- Isaac Kleiner
- Rodney McKay
- Samantha Carterª
- Larry Fleinhardt
- Leonardo Vetra
- Quinn Mallory
- Maximillian Arturo
- Nicholas Rush
- Daniel Faraday
- Catherine Elizabeth Halsey
- Milo Rambaldi
- Reed Richards
- Victor Von Doom
- Radek Zelenka
- Sheldon Cooper
- Rosalind and Robert Lutece
- Rick Sanchez

== See also ==
- List of scientists
- List of physicists

== Notes ==
* Experimentalist also
º Astronomer, astrophysicist or cosmologist also
^ Developed new mathematics
† Contributed to chemistry
‡ Contributed to biology
ª Women in theoretical physics
