= Fadin =

Fadin may refer to:

- Famotidine, a drug that inhibits stomach acid production

== People with the surname ==
- Victor Sergeevich Fadin (born 1942), Russian theoretical physicist
