= Andrej Arbuzov =

Russian theoretical physicist (born 1967)

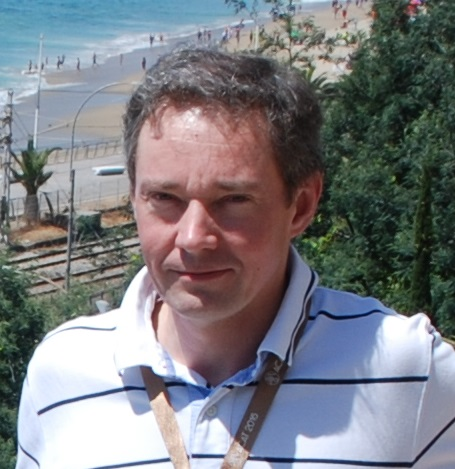
- Born: Андрей Борисович Арбузов; 30 June 1967 (age 59); Protvino, Russia, USSR
- Education: Moscow State University
- Scientific career
- Fields: Theoretical physics, quantum field theory, elementary particle physics, cosmology
- Workplaces: Joint Institute for Nuclear Research
- Doctoral advisor: Eduard Kuraev

Andrej Borisovich Arbuzov (Russian: Андрей Борисович Арбузов) (born 30 June 1967 in Protvino, USSR) is a Russian theoretical physicist. His scientific interests include quantum field theory, elementary particle physics, and cosmology. He is affiliated with the Joint Institute for Nuclear Research as a group leader in the Bogoliubov Laboratory of Theoretical Physics. He is a Doctor of Sciences in physical-mathematical sciences (2011), professor of the Russian Academy of Sciences (2016).

== Biography ==
Andrej Arbuzov was born in Protvino, Moscow region on 30 June 1967. His father is Boris Arbuzov.

=== Education ===
- Graduated from the Lomonosov Moscow State University, the Faculty of Physics (1992).

=== Scientific and academic degrees ===
- Candidate of sciences degree in physical-mathematical sciences with the theoretical physics specialty was received from the Joint Institute for Nuclear Research (1996) under the guidance of professor Eduard Kuraev.
- Doctor of Sciences degree in physical-mathematical sciences with the theoretical physics specialty was defended at the Institute for Nuclear Research (INR RAS) (2011).
- Academic rank: professor of the Russian Academy of Sciences (2016).

=== Career ===
- 1992—1998 work in the Bogoliubov Laboratory of Theoretical Physics, Joint Institute for Nuclear Research, Dubna, Russia.
- 1999—2000 postdoctoral researcher at the University of Turin, Turin, Italy.
- 2001—2002 postdoctoral researcher at the University of Alberta, Edmonton, Canada.
- Since 2002 work in the Bogoliubov Laboratory of Theoretical Physics, Joint Institute for Nuclear Research, Dubna, Russia.
- 2012—2017 worked as a Deputy director of the Bogoliubov Laboratory of Theoretical Physics, Joint Institute for Nuclear Research.
- Professor at the Dubna State University.
- Secretary of the "Physics of Elementary Particles and Atomic Nuclei" journal editorial board.
- Member of the "MDPI Universe journal" advisory board.
- In February 2022 he signed a letter by Russian scientists condemning Russia's invasion of Ukraine.

=== Scientific achievements ===
Scientific interests of A. B. Arbuzov include quantum field theory, phenomenology of the Standard Model of particle physics, radiative corrections, and Cosmology. He contributed to the development of theoretical methods for high-precision description of particle interactions. His results were used in the data analysis of many experiments at colliders including HERA, VEPP-2000, LEP, and LHC.

== Scientific publications ==
- In the inSPIRE database
- In the Scopus database
- In the Google Scholar database
