= Dietrich Belitz =

American theoretical physicist (born 1955)

- Born: 1955 (age 69–70); Germany
- Occupation: Theoretical physicist
- Title: Professor

Academic background
- Education: Baccalaureate diploma, 1980; Dr. rer. nat., 1982
- Alma mater: Technical University of Munich
- Thesis: Der Einfluß inkohärenter Tunnelprozesse auf die Leitfähigkeit ungeordneter Materialien
- Doctoral advisor: Wolfgang Götze

Dietrich Belitz (born 1955) is an American theoretical physicist on the faculty of the University of Oregon. He studies statistical mechanics and condensed matter physics.

== Early life and education ==
Belitz earned his Diploma in 1980 and his Dr. rer. nat. degree in 1982, both from the Technical University of Munich (Germany). His dissertation was titled, Der Einfluß inkohärenter Tunnelprozesse auf die Leitfähigkeit ungeordneter Materialien (trans.: The influence of incoherent tunneling processes on the conductivity of disordered materials), advised by Wolfgang Götze. He did postdoctoral work at the University of Maryland, College Park.

== Career ==
In 1987 Belitz joined the faculty at the University of Oregon and is a member of the Materials Science Institute there. Belitz became a professor of physics in 1997. His research has included statistical mechanics, condensed matter, and theory of quantum many-body systems."

Reviews of Modern Physics describes Belitz' interests as, "... focused on quantum many-body problems, including superconductivity, magnetism, transport processes, and quantum phase transitions."

Belitz is a member of the University's Condensed Matter Theory & Statistical Mechanics group, which describes their work as the study of:

... strongly fluctuating systems with a large number (e.g., the Avogadro number!) of degrees of freedom. These include quantum many-body problems, "soft" phases of matter, and biological systems. The quantum phenomena we study include superconductivity and magnetism; quantum phase transitions, in particular metal-insulator and magnetic transitions; and transport theory. The soft systems include liquid crystals; complex fluids; slender flexible structures (e.g. polymer chains, a sheet of paper, or a ping-pong ball); macromolecular liquids and mixtures, and their phase separation through coarse-graining and multiscale modeling; and mechanical metamaterials. The biological systems include flocks, evolving populations, epidemics, trees, proteins, nucleic acids, and protein/nucleic acid complexes.

Belitz served as department head of physics from 1998–2004, associate dean for natural sciences from 2004–2010, and as director of the Institute of Theoretical Science at the University of Oregon from 2013–2019.

From 2005 to 2020, Belitz served as associate editor for condensed matter theory for Reviews of Modern Physics.

== Selected publications ==
- Brando, M.; Belitz, D.; Grosche, F. M.; Kirkpatrick, T. R. (May 31, 2016). "Metallic quantum ferromagnets". Reviews of Modern Physics. 88 (2) 025006. arXiv:1502.02898. Bibcode:2016RvMP...88b5006B. doi:10.1103/RevModPhys.88.025006. S2CID 118549240.
- Belitz, D.; Kirkpatrick, T. R.; Vojta, Thomas (July 5, 2005). "How generic scale invariance influences quantum and classical phase transitions". Reviews of Modern Physics. 77 (2): 579–632. arXiv:cond-mat/0403182. Bibcode:2005RvMP...77..579B. doi:10.1103/RevModPhys.77.579. S2CID 119330522.
- Belitz, D.; Kirkpatrick, T. R. (April 1, 1994). "The Anderson-Mott transition". Reviews of Modern Physics. 66 (2): 261–380. Bibcode:1994RvMP...66..261B. doi:10.1103/RevModPhys.66.261.
- Belitz, D.; Kirkpatrick, T. R.; Vojta, Thomas (June 7, 1999). "First Order Transitions and Multicritical Points in Weak Itinerant Ferromagnets". Physical Review Letters. 82 (23): 4707–4710. arXiv:cond-mat/9812420. Bibcode:1999PhRvL..82.4707B. doi:10.1103/PhysRevLett.82.4707. S2CID 118940717.
- Belitz, D.; Kirkpatrick, T. R.; Vojta, Thomas (April 15, 1997). "Nonanalytic behavior of the spin susceptibility in clean Fermi systems". Physical Review B. 55 (15): 9452–9462. arXiv:cond-mat/9611099. Bibcode:1997PhRvB..55.9452B. doi:10.1103/PhysRevB.55.9452. S2CID 118985506.
- Belitz, D.; Kirkpatrick, T. R.; Rollbühler, Jörg (June 21, 2005). "Tricritical Behavior in Itinerant Quantum Ferromagnets". Physical Review Letters. 94 (24) 247205. arXiv:cond-mat/0410344. Bibcode:2005PhRvL..94x7205B. doi:10.1103/PhysRevLett.94.247205. S2CID 119364435.

== Awards, honors ==
- American Physical Society Fellow, 2010. Citation: For work on classical and quantal phase transitions, and the nature of phases affected by generic scale invariance.
