= Vladimir Baryshevsky =

Belarusian physicist

Vladimir Grigoryevich Baryshevsky
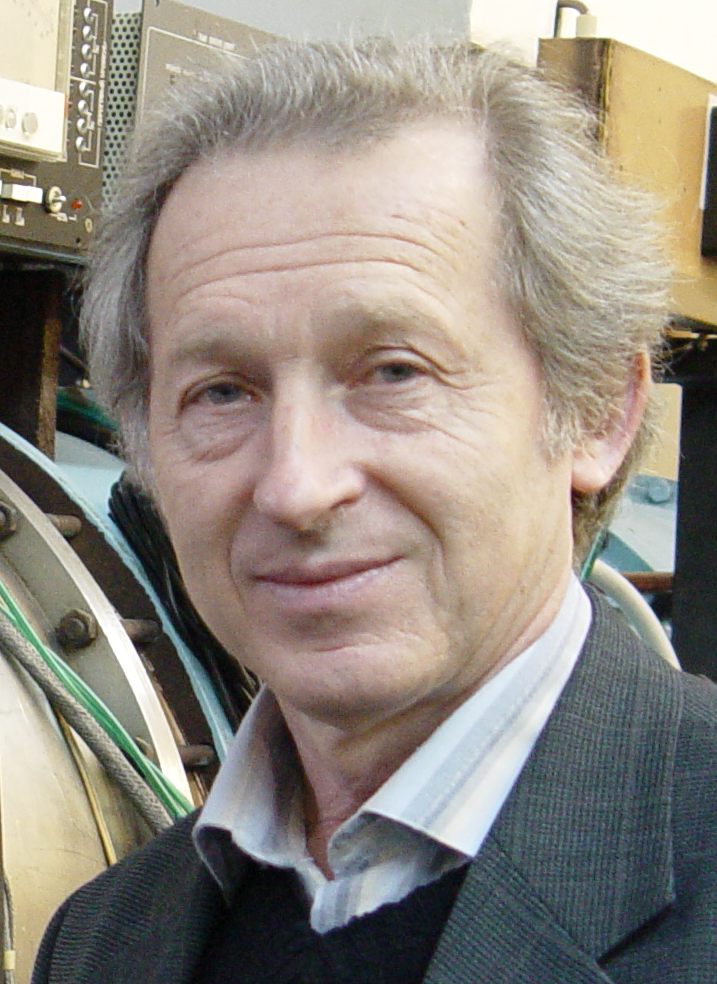
- Born: Владимир Григорьевич Барышевский; July 1, 1940; Minsk, Belarus, USSR
- Education: Belarusian State University
- Awards: Order of the Badge of Honour (1981, USSR), Honored Scientist of the Republic of Belarus (1996), Order of Francysk Skaryna (2001, Republic of Belarus), State Prize of the Republic of Belarus in Science and Technology (2002)
- Scientific career
- Fields: Theoretical physics, Nuclear physics
- Workplaces: Research Institute for Nuclear Problems of Belarusian State University

Vladimir Grigoryevich Baryshevsky (Russian: Владимир Григорьевич Барышевский; Belarusian: Уладзімір Рыгоравіч Барышэўскі; born 1 July 1940) is a Soviet and Belarusian physicist, Honored Scientist of the Republic of Belarus, Winner of the State Prize of the Republic of Belarus. He is the founder and the leader of the scientific school "Nuclear optics of polarized media."

Prof Vladimir Baryshevsky is the founder and Honorary Director of the Research Institute for Nuclear Problems (INP) at BSU. He has authored two registered discoveries in the field of nuclear physics, three patents, four books, and more than 400 scientific research papers published in international scientific journals. Prof Baryshevsky is the scientific leader in developing a new class of electromagnetic radiation sources - volume-free electron lasers (VFEL), and the founder of the world-wide recognized scientific direction: High Energy Nuclear Optics.

He has mentored 23 Ph.D. students and supervised 6 Sc.D. in Physics. He received the Gold Medal from the European Scientific-Industrial Chamber for exceptional achievements in the field of physics.

Prof Baryshevsky holds a Ph.D. in Physics from BSU (Minsk) and Sc.D. from MEPhI (Moscow).

== Biography ==
Baryshevsky was born on 1 July 1940 in Minsk.

Baryshevsky received a diploma degree in physics from the Belarusian State University (BSU) in 1962. From 1962 to 1965, he pursued his Ph.D. degree study at the Joint Institute for Nuclear Research (JINR, Dubna, Moscow Region) and earned his Ph.D. (Candidate of Sciences) degree in 1965 (BSU, Minsk). In 1972 he defended his D.Sc. dissertation at the National Research Nuclear University MEPhI (Moscow). In 1965 he started teaching at the Department of Nuclear Physics of BSU, where he holds positions of assistant professor, associate professor, and from 1977 as a full professor after obtaining State Diploma of full professor of nuclear physics.

In 1986, Baryshevsky established the Research Institute for Nuclear Problems of Belarusian State University (INP) and acted as the general director of this research institute for more than two decades, up to 2012. Currently, he holds the honorary director and principal research scientist positions at INP.

Baryshevsky is a member of the Dissertation Council D 01.05.02. in the B.I.Stepanov Institute of Physics of the National Academy of Sciences of the Republic of Belarus and a member of the Editorial Board of the International Journal of Applied Spectroscopy (Minsk).

Baryshevsky is the author of two scientific discoveries registered in the USSR.

== Research ==
Scientific discovery “The phenomenon of nuclear precession of neutrons. “

Formula of the discovery: The earlier unknown phenomenon of neutron nuclear precession was ascertained theoretically. The phenomenon is that when neutrons pass through matter with polarized nuclei, the precession of neutron spins about the nuclei’s polarization direction in matter arises due to nuclear neutron-nucleus interaction. (Authors: V.G. Baryshevsky and M.I. Podgoretsky, the priority number and date: N 244 from April 3, 1964.)

Scientific discovery “The phenomenon of polarization plane rotation of hard gamma-quanta.”

Formula of the discovery: The earlier unknown phenomenon of polarization plane rotation was ascertained for hard gamma-quanta. The phenomenon consists of the fact that when gamma-quanta pass through the medium with polarized electrons, their polarization plane rotates due to the spin-spin interaction of the electrons and photons. (Authors: V.G. Baryshevsky, V.M. Lobashev, V.L. Lyuboshitz, A.P. Serebrov, and A.P. Smotritsky, the priority number and date: N 360, the priority from February 12, 1965, as for theoretical justification and from July 28, 1971 as for experimental proof of the phenomenon. The application for discovery: N 10886 from February 13, 1984. The registration date: December 22, 1988, date of the certificate issue: June 21, 1991.)

Vladimir Baryshevsky pioneered research of the Volume Free Electron Laser — a new type of the Free-electron laser.

Major research areas

- Research and development of Volume Free Electron Laser
- Nuclear optics of polarized media
- Electromagnetic processes in crystals at high energies
- Magnetic cumulation of explosive energy
- effects of P- and T-violating

Vladimir Baryshevsky is the founder and the leader of the scientific school "Nuclear optics of polarized media." Among his students are 6 Doctors of Sciences: I.D. Feranchuk, V.V. Tikhomirov, S.A. Maksimenko, M.V. Korjik, A.S. Lobko, and A.Ya. Silenko and 23 Ph.D. holders: I.D. Feranchuk, V.V. Tikhomirov, S.A. Maksimenko, M.V. Korjik, A.S. Lobko, I.Ya. Dubovskaya, A.O. Grubich, S.V. Charapitsa, S.A. Kuten, A.V. Ivashin, A.V. Zege, I.V. Polikarpov, V.V. Rapopport, O.N. Metelitsa, O.M. Lugovskaya, L.N. Korennaya, V.I. Tkacheva, Ngo Dan Nyan, Le Tien Hai, A.A. Gurinovich, A.A. Rouba, E.A. Gurnevich, S.V. Anischenko.

== Selected papers ==
Vladimir Baryshevsky is the author of more than 200 publications, including 5 monographs:

- V.G. Baryshevsky, Nuclear Optics of Polarized Media, Belarusian State University, Minsk, 1977, 144 p [in Russian]
- V.G. Baryshevsky, Channeling, radiation, and Reactions in Crystals at High Energies, Belarusian State University, Minsk, 1982, 256 p [in Russian]
- V.G. Baryshevsky, Nuclear Optics of Polarized Media, Energoatomizdat, Moscow, 1995, 320 p [in Russian]
- V. G. Baryshevsky, I.D. Feranchuk, A.P. Ulyanenkov. Parametric X-Ray Radiation in Crystals: Theory, Experiment and Applications. Series: Springer Tracts in Modern Physics, Springer. 2006
- V. G. Baryshevsky «High-Energy Nuclear Optics of Polarized Particles». World Scientific Publishing Company; 640 p. (2012) ISBN 9814324833

== Honors and awards ==
- Order of the Badge of Honour (1981, USSR);
- Honored Scientist of the Republic of Belarus (1996);
- Order of Francysk Skaryna (2001, Republic of Belarus);
- Belarus State Prize in Science and Technology (2002) for long-term research “Quantum electrodynamics and coherent nuclear processes in the medium: quantum nuclear optics” in co-operation with A.V. Berestov, S.Ya. Kilin, E.A. Rudak, V.V. Tikhomirov, and I.D. Feranchuk);
- Honored Member of the BSU Staff;
- Certificate of Excellence from the Council of Ministers of the Republic of Belarus (2015);
- Certificate of Gratitude from the President of the Republic of Belarus for longstanding scientific and pedagogical activities, significant personal contribution to education of highly qualified research personnel, and implementation of high-end technologies (2020).
