= Graciela Gelmini =

Theoretical physicist

- Born: Graciela Beatriz Gelmini; Argentina
- Scientific career
- Fields: Particle physics
- Workplaces: LMU Munich; ICTP (1982 – 1989); UCLA (1989 – present)
- Thesis: (1981)
- Doctoral advisor: Roberto Peccei; Carlos A. Garcia Canal

Graciela Beatriz Gelmini is a theoretical physicist who specializes in astroparticle physics. She is a professor at the University of California, Los Angeles (UCLA), and became a fellow of the American Physical Society in 2004.

== Early life and career ==
Gelmini received her Ph.D. from the National University of La Plata in 1981. Her doctoral advisors were Roberto Peccei and Carlos A. Garcia Canal.

Upon graduation, Gelmini worked at LMU Munich in Germany for a few years before moving to the International Centre for Theoretical Physics in Italy at around 1982. During this time, she was based at CERN in Switzerland. Gelmini was also affiliated with the Lyman Laboratory of Physics at Harvard University and the Enrico Fermi Institute at the University of Chicago between 1986 and 1988.

In November 1989, Gelmini joined UCLA as a faculty member and has been there ever since.

== Scientific contributions ==
In November 2007, Gelmini was part of a team that analyzed data from the Pierre Auger Observatory in Argentina and discovered high-energy particles that made it to Earth from nearby black holes.

== Publications ==
- Gelmini, G. B.; Roncadelli, M. (1981). "Left-handed neutrino mass scale and spontaneously broken lepton number". Physics Letters B. 99 (5): 411–415. Bibcode:1981PhLB...99..411G. doi:10.1016/0370-2693(81)90559-1. ISSN 0370-2693.
- Gelmini, Graciela B. (2015), "The Hunt for Dark Matter", Journeys Through the Precision Frontier: Amplitudes for Colliders, WORLD SCIENTIFIC, pp. 559–616, doi:10.1142/9789814678766_0012, ISBN 978-981-4678-75-9
