= Gian Michele Graf =

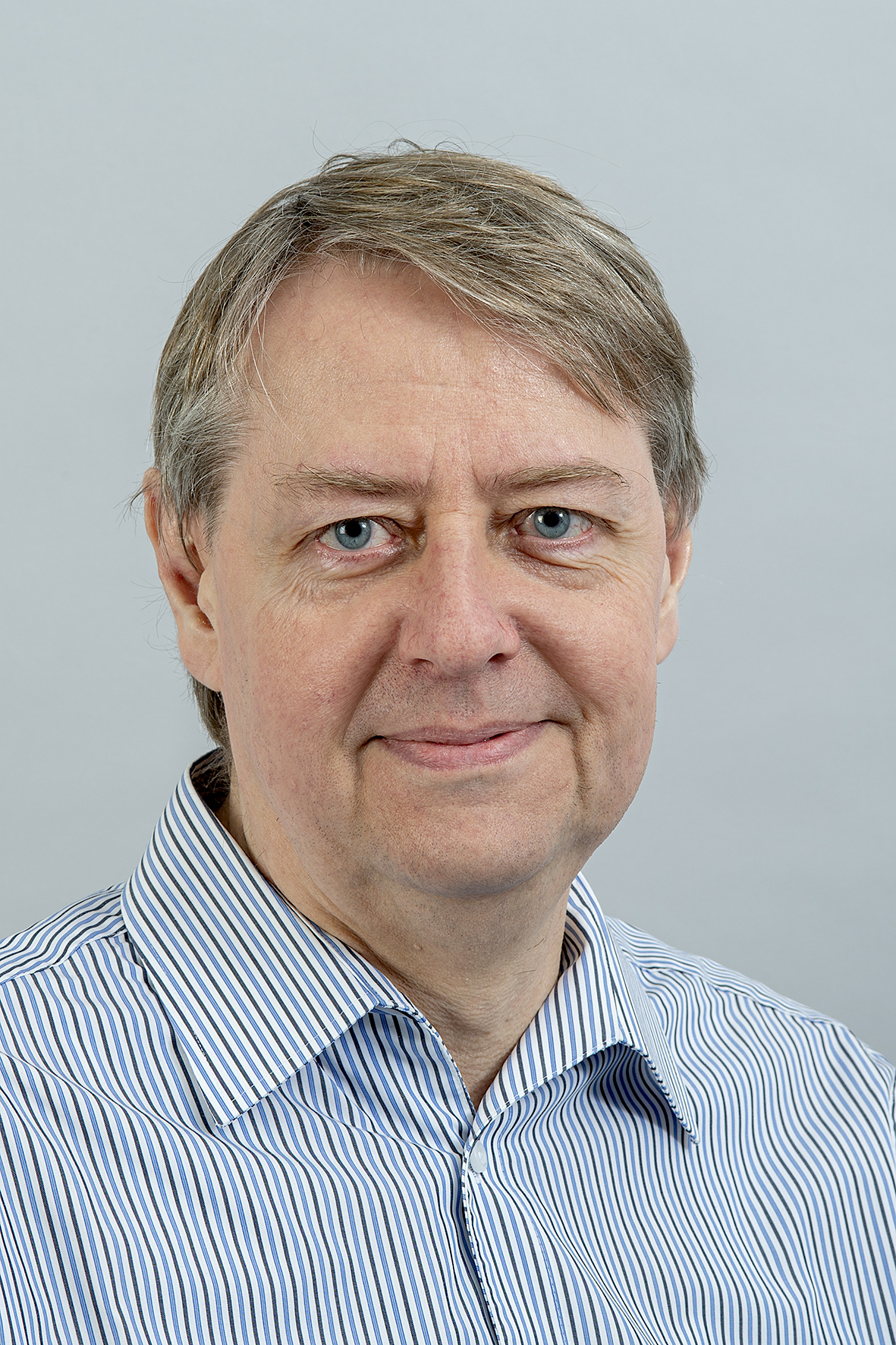
Gian Michele Graf in 2019

Gian Michele Graf (born 14 July 1962) is a Swiss mathematical physicist.

Graf studied physics and mathematics at ETH Zurich, where he graduated in 1986 with Diplom thesis supervised by Jürg Fröhlich and received his doctorate in 1990 with thesis supervised by Walter Hunziker (1935–2012) . From 1990 to 1992 Graf was an assistant professor of mathematics at Caltech. At ETH Zurich he was from 1992 to 1998 an assistant professor and from 1998 to 2001 an associate professor and is since 2001 a full professor.

He was at the Institute for Advanced Study in 1996 and in 2002. He has been a visiting researcher in six different countries.

Graf's research deals with fundamental thermodynamic properties of matter (especially questions related to the problem of the "stability of matter" mathematically investigated by Elliott Lieb and others), many-body scattering processes in quantum mechanics, quantum pumps and various problems of solid-state physics such as the quantum Hall effect and topological insulators.

He was a plenary speaker at the 10th International Congress on Mathematical Physics (ICMP) in Leipzig in 1991 and an invited speaker at the 14th ICMP in Lisbon in 2003. In 1992 he was a Sloan Fellow. He was an invited speaker of the International Congress of Mathematicians (ICM) in 1998 in Berlin and of the ICM in 2006 in Madrid.

Graf is a Swiss Bürger of Lugano and Rebstein.

== Selected publications ==
- Graf, Gian Michele (1990). "Asymptotic completeness for N-body short-range quantum systems: A new proof". Communications in Mathematical Physics. 132 (1): 73–101. Bibcode:1990CMaPh.132...73G. doi:10.1007/BF02278000. S2CID 123376798.
- Graf, Gian Michele; Solovej, Jan Philip (1994). "A Correlation Estimate with Applications to Quantum Systems with Coulomb Interactions". Reviews in Mathematical Physics. 06 (5a): 977–997. Bibcode:1994RvMaP...6..977G. doi:10.1142/S0129055X94000328.
- Graf, Gian Michele (1994). "Anderson localization and the space-time characteristic of continuum states". Journal of Statistical Physics. 75 (1–2): 337–346. Bibcode:1994JSP....75..337G. doi:10.1007/BF02186292. ISSN 0022-4715. S2CID 122136518.
- Aizenman, M.; Graf, G. M. (1998). "Localization bounds for an electron gas". Journal of Physics A: Mathematical and General. 31 (32): 6783–6806. arXiv:cond-mat/9603116. Bibcode:1998JPhA...31.6783A. doi:10.1088/0305-4470/31/32/004.
- Avron, J. E.; Elgart, A.; Graf, G. M.; Sadun, L. (2000). "Geometry, statistics, and asymptotics of quantum pumps". Physical Review B. 62 (16): R10618–R10621. arXiv:cond-mat/0002194. Bibcode:2000PhRvB..6210618A. doi:10.1103/PhysRevB.62.R10618.
- Avron, J. E.; Elgart, A.; Graf, G. M.; Sadun, L. (2001). "Optimal Quantum Pumps". Physical Review Letters. 87 (23) 236601. arXiv:math-ph/0105011. Bibcode:2001PhRvL..87w6601A. doi:10.1103/PhysRevLett.87.236601. PMID 11736465.
- Elbau, P.; Graf, G. M. (2002). "Equality of Bulk and Edge Hall Conductance Revisited". Communications in Mathematical Physics. 229 (3): 415–432. arXiv:math-ph/0203019. Bibcode:2002CMaPh.229..415E. doi:10.1007/s00220-002-0698-z.
- Aschbacher, W. H.; Fröhlich, J.; Graf, G. M.; Schnee, K.; Troyer, M. (2002). "Symmetry breaking regime in the nonlinear Hartree equation". Journal of Mathematical Physics. 43 (8): 3879–3891. Bibcode:2002JMP....43.3879A. doi:10.1063/1.1488673. ISSN 0022-2488.
- Hassler, F.; Suslov, M. V.; Graf, G. M.; Lebedev, M. V.; Lesovik, G. B.; Blatter, G. (2008). "Wave-packet formalism of full counting statistics". Physical Review B. 78 (16) 165330. arXiv:0802.0143. Bibcode:2008PhRvB..78p5330H. doi:10.1103/PhysRevB.78.165330.
- Graf, Gian Michele; Porta, Marcello (2013). "Bulk-Edge Correspondence for Two-Dimensional Topological Insulators". Communications in Mathematical Physics. 324 (3): 851–895. arXiv:1207.5989. Bibcode:2013CMaPh.324..851G. doi:10.1007/s00220-013-1819-6. ISSN 0010-3616.
