= Research Institute for Nuclear Problems of Belarusian State University =

Research institute in Minsk, Belarus

Coordinates: 53°53′34″N 27°32′49″E

Research Institute for Nuclear Problems of Belarusian State University (INP BSU)
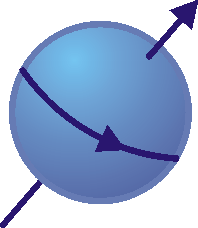
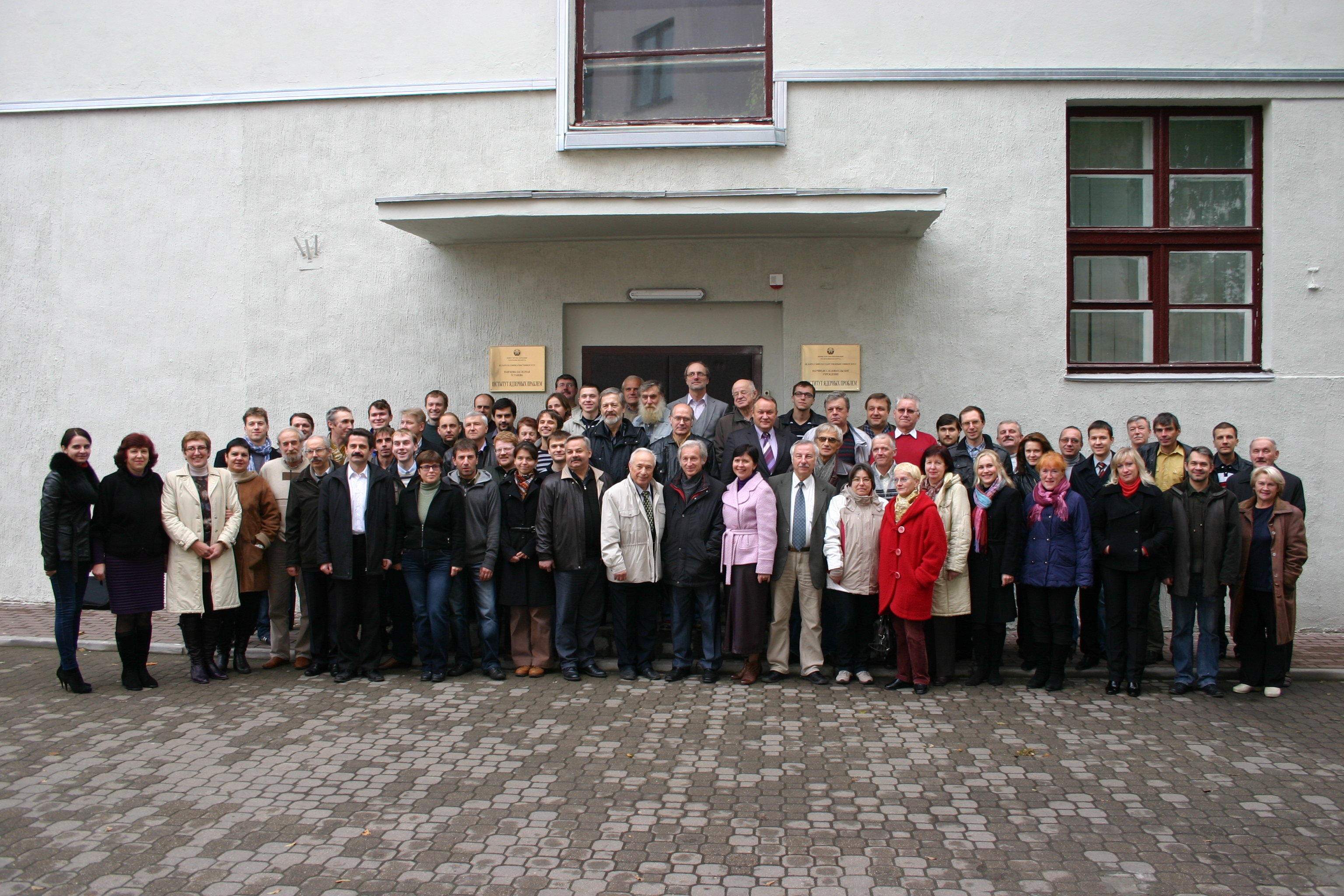
- Established: 1986
- Field of research: Nuclear and particle physics, nanotechnology
- Director: Sergei A. Maksimenko
- Staff: 97 (2014)
- Location: Bobruyskaya str. 11, Minsk, 220030, Republic of Belarus, Minsk / Belarus
- Affiliations: Belarusian State University
- Website: inp.bsu.by

The Research Institute for Nuclear Problems of the Belarusian State University (INP BSU) is a research institute in Minsk, Belarus. Founded on September 1, 1986, by a decree of the Soviet government, its main fields of research are nuclear physics, particle physics, materials science and nanotechnology.

Its first General Director, now Honorary Director was Vladimir G. Baryshevsky, Doctor of Sciences (Physics and Math), Professor, Honored Scientist of the Republic of Belarus, and winner of the State Prize of the Republic of Belarus in the field of science and technology. He was awarded the Skarina Order and the Order of Honor and was the co-author of two registered discoveries of the USSR in nuclear physics (No. 224 (1979) and No. 360 (1981)). Professor Sergei A. Maksimenko has been serving as the INP General Director since January 2013.

== Major research areas ==
Its major research areas include nuclear and elementary-particle physics, cosmo-particle physics and nuclear astrophysics; extreme states of matter under ultrahigh temperatures and pressures, and magnetic cumulation of energy; novel composite, nano- and microstructured materials; radio- and nuclear technologies based on radioactive sources, accelerators, and nuclear reactors; as well as novel methods for ionizing radiation measurements.

Nanoelectromagnetism is a relatively new research area exploring the effects caused by the interaction of electromagnetic (or other) radiation with nanosized objects and nanostructured systems. A scientific school on nanoelectromagnetism is currently being developed (headed by Professor Sergei A. Maksimenko and Professor Grigory Ya. Slepyan).

== Most important achievements ==
One of the institute's significant achievements was the theoretical prediction and experimental discovery of parametric x-ray radiation (PXR), a new form of radiation produced when charged particles traverse a crystal lattice. PXR generated by high-energy protons was first detected on the accelerator at the Institute for High Energy Physics in Protvino, Russia, while the multiwave regime of PXR generation from electrons was later observed on the SIRIUS accelerator in Tomsk, Russia.

Another major accomplishment was the prediction of a new type of radiation emitted by relativistic charged particles, such as electrons and positrons, when they are channeled through crystals. This phenomenon was subsequently confirmed through experiments conducted at multiple physics research centers around the world.

The institute also contributed significantly to the study of spin-related phenomena in particle physics. It theoretically predicted, and later, in collaboration with the Institute of Physics of the National Academy of Sciences of Belarus, experimentally confirmed, the oscillation of the three-gamma decay annihilation plane of ortho-positronium in a magnetic field.

Another major achievement was the prediction of a previously unknown property of the muonium atom: the existence of a quadrupole moment in its ground state, which was subsequently verified experimentally.

Theoretical work at the institute also led to the prediction of spin oscillations and spin dichroism, demonstrating that deuterons and other high-energy particles moving through unpolarized matter can acquire tensor polarization. The spin dichroism effect was later observed in joint experiments conducted in Germany and at the Joint Institute for Nuclear Research in Russia.

In addition, the phenomenon of spin rotation of high-energy particles in bent crystals was first predicted by researchers at the institute and was later experimentally confirmed at Fermilab.

Researchers at the institute made several pioneering contributions to the study of electromagnetic and particle–matter interactions in crystals. They predicted, and later at CERN confirmed, the synchrotron-type production of electron–positron pairs in crystals. Theoretical work also led to the prediction of dichroism and birefringence of high-energy gamma quanta in crystalline media.

Another major contribution was the prediction of radiative cooling of high-energy electrons traversing crystals, a phenomenon later observed experimentally at CERN. The institute also developed a new class of electromagnetic radiation sources known as volume free-electron lasers, which opened new avenues in coherent radiation generation.

A further advancement was the prediction of multiple volume reflection of high-energy particles from several crystallographic planes within a single bent crystal; this effect was later confirmed at CERN. Researchers also provided the theoretical basis for time-reversal non-invariant phenomena, including rotation of the polarization plane and birefringence of light in matter subjected to a magnetic field, as well as CP- and T-non-invariant effects leading to induced electric dipole moments in atoms and nuclei under similar conditions.

In addition, the institute played a leading role in Belarus in the development of explosive flux-compression generators capable of producing extremely high voltages and currents, establishing foundational expertise in this advanced technological field.

Important theoretical advances were also made in cosmology and nanophotonics. By analyzing how primordial black holes would have absorbed the relativistic plasma present in the early Universe, researchers derived new constraints on the possible existence and size of extra spatial dimensions—placing tighter limits on models of higher-dimensional space.

In the field of nanoelectromagnetism, the institute developed a comprehensive theory describing how electromagnetic waves scatter from isolated, finite-length carbon nanotubes. This theory successfully explains both the qualitative behavior and the quantitative characteristics of the prominent terahertz-range absorption peak observed in CNT-based composite materials, providing a solid foundation for interpreting and engineering their electromagnetic properties.

The institute also made significant contributions to nanomaterials research. The existence of localized plasmon resonance in composite materials containing single-walled carbon nanotubes was experimentally confirmed, opening pathways to new applications ranging from advanced electromagnetic-shielding materials to emerging techniques in medical diagnostics and treatment.

In high-energy physics, researchers developed lead tungstate (PbWO_{4}, or PWO), now one of the world's most widely used scintillation materials. PWO crystals serve as the foundation of the electromagnetic calorimeters in major LHC experiments—including CMS and ALICE—as well as in the PANDA experiment in Germany. INP scientists have long been part of the CMS collaboration at CERN, which, together with ATLAS, announced the discovery of the Higgs boson in 2012 in Physics Letters B(716/1).

In applied research, the institute continues to advance microwave power engineering, developing innovative industrial, agricultural, and environmental applications of microwave radiation.
