= Aditi Mitra =

American physicist

- Education: Presidency College; IIT Kanpur; Indiana University Bloomington
- Known for: Molecular scale electronics; Non-equilibrium quantum systems

Aditi Mitra is an American theoretical condensed matter physicist known for her research on molecular scale electronics and non-equilibrium quantum systems. Other topics in her research include floquet theory and topological insulators. She is a professor of physics at New York University.

== Education and career ==
Mitra studied physics at Presidency College, graduating in 1993, and earned a master's degree in physics in 1995 at IIT Kanpur. She came to the US for doctoral study in physics at Indiana University Bloomington, and completed her Ph.D. there in 2002. Her dissertation, Transport and spin-pseudospin domain walls in integer quantum Hall systems, was supervised by Steven Girvin.

She became a postdoctoral researcher at Columbia University and the University of Toronto before joining the New York University faculty in 2006.

== Recognition ==
Mitra was named a Simons Fellow in Theoretical Physics in 2013. In 2018, Mitra was named a Fellow of the American Physical Society (APS), after a nomination from the APS Division of Condensed Matter Physics, "for pioneering theoretical studies of out-of-equilibrium quantum systems, including nonequilibrium criticality, topological phenomena under time-periodic driving, and the dynamics of entanglement statistics".
