= Rembert Duine =

Dutch theoretical physicist

- Born: 2 March 1975 (age 50); Oud-Alblas
- Occupation(s): Professor, Utrecht University
- Website: Rembert's Homepage

Rembert A. Duine (born 2 March 1975) is a professor of theoretical physics at Utrecht University in the Netherlands and a part-time professor at Eindhoven University of Technology in the Netherlands. He wrote his PhD thesis under the supervision of Henk Stoof, working on ultracold atoms. He has authored and co-authored more than 100 papers on spintronics, ultracold atoms, and condensation in dissipative systems like photons, magnons, and excitons. In 2019, Duine received a prestigious NWO Vici grant of 1.5 Million Euros.

Besides other notable achievements, landmark publications by Duine and his collaborators have led to the opening of new sub-fields of physics, such as magnetic skyrmion spintronics, antiferromagnetic spintronics, and cold-atom spintronics.
