= Thierry Giamarchi =

French physicist (born 1963)

Thierry Giamarchi (born 1963) is a French physicist.

== Biography ==
Thierry Giamarchi studied in Toulouse and Marseille and after preparatory classes at the Lycée Thiers became a student at the École Normale Supérieure (1982). He passed his thesis under the direction of H.J. Schulz at the Paris-Sud University (now Paris-Saclay) in 1987.

He has been a permanent researcher at the CNRS since 1986, and during the period 1990-1992 did a postdoctoral fellowship at Bell Laboratories (USA). In 2002 he became full professor at the University of Geneva in the Department of Quantum Matter Physics (DQMP) and was head of this department from 2013 to 2019. He is currently vice-president (since 2017) of a Swiss association on materials with remarkable electronic properties (MaNEP).

In addition to his research activities, he has been in charge of several administrative activities such as the direction of the Department of Quantum Matter Physics (DQMP) (2013-2019), member of the Research Commission of the University of Geneva (2018-2020), member of the CNRS National Committee for Theoretical Physics (2000-2002), member of the Scientific Committee of the School of Physics of Les Houches (2007-2016) or member of the Scientific Council of the Commissariat à l'Énergie Atomique (CEA) (2015-2018).

Since 2013, he has been a member of the French Academy of sciences and a Fellow of the American Physical Society.

== Research ==
His research has focused on the effects of interactions in low-dimensional quantum systems, as well as on the combined effects of disorder and interactions in both classical and quantum systems. This work has led to the discovery of new disordered phases such as Bose glass and Bragg glass.

For quantum systems his work has focused on the effects of interactions in one- or nearly one-dimensional quantum structures, known as Tomonaga-Luttinger liquids. In particular, he has studied how such effects can occur in systems such as organic superconductors or coupled quantum spin chains.

He also showed that such systems have properties normally associated with travelling systems, such as Bose-Einstein condensation, and thus could be used as quantum simulators for such systems. Tomonaga-Luttinger's liquid physics is relevant not only for condensed matter but also for ultra-cold atom systems.

In the presence of disorder he studied, in collaboration with H.J. Schulz, the combined effects of disorder and interactions on one-dimensional interacting bosons or fermions and showed that the interactions significantly modified the effects of disorder. Especially for bosons this combination of interactions and disorder leads to a transition between a superfluid and a localized phase of bosons known as Bose glass. This phase is currently being intensively studied in the context of ultra-cold atoms.

For classical systems he has shown, in collaboration with P. Le Doussal, that the effects of disorder on periodic elastic structures, such as the Abrikosov vortex grating in a superconductor, led to a new vitreous phase of the matter having the appearance of a solid (Bragg glass), a phase that could be revealed by neutron diffraction. This work, as well as the study of the dynamics of such systems, is also directly relevant to the properties of materials useful for information storage such as magnetic films and ferroelectrics.

== Awards ==
- 2000: Abragam prize of the French Academy of sciences
- 2013: Member of the French Academy of sciences
- 2013: Fellow of the American Physical Society
