= Anna Ceresole =

Italian theoretical physicist

- Education: University of Turin; State University of New York
- Scientific career
- Workplaces: Istituto Nazionale di Fisica Nucleare California Institute of Technology Polytechnic University of Turin

Anna Ceresole (born 1961) is an Italian high energy physicist and Director of Research in Theoretical Physics at the Istituto Nazionale di Fisica Nucleare (INFN). She is interested in quantum field theory, supergravity and string theory.

== Early life and education ==
Ceresole was born in Turin and studied at the University of Turin. Her thesis considered Kaluza–Klein theory and supergravity, which resulted in published work with Pietro Fré and Hermann Nicolai. She earned her PhD at the State University of New York at Stony Brook in 1989, working with Peter van Nieuwenhuizen. Here she was a Fulbright Program Fellow.

== Research ==
Ceresole joined California Institute of Technology in 1989, working as a postdoctoral fellow. She was appointed as a research fellow at the University of Turin in 1992. In 1998 she joined CERN as a visiting scientist. She was made research professor at the Polytechnic University of Turin in 2003. In 2004 she described a superpotential that supported a class of stable extremal black holes. She works on special Kähler manifold geometry and black hole solutions in supergravity.

She was a team member of the European Research Council Advanced Investigator Grant, Supersymmetry, Quantum Gravity and Gauge Fields. She was a working group leader for the European Cooperation in Science and Technology String Theory Universe COST action.

In 2015 she was appointed as the coordinator of the Istituto Nazionale di Fisica Nucleare Theory Group in Torino. Since 2017 she is part of the Management Committee of the Arnold Regge Centre for Algebra, Geometry and Theoretical Physics, a collaboration between the University of Turin and University of Eastern Piedmont. She has been Scientific Advisor for several international string theory conferences. She has contributed to many important textbooks on geometry and supergravity.
