= Erhard Scheibe =

German philosopher

Erhard Scheibe (24 September 1927 – 7 January 2010) was a German philosopher of science. His works discuss the philosophy of physics and the interpretations of quantum mechanics. He was professor at the University of Heidelberg.

Scheibe studied in Göttingen, where he also received his doctorate in mathematics in 1955. From 1957, he was an assistant to Carl Friedrich von Weizsäcker. In 1963, he habilitated in philosophy at the University of Hamburg with his thesis "Die contingenten Sätze in der Physik," which dealt with philosophical problems of quantum mechanics. He then became a full professor of philosophy in Göttingen. In 1977, he was elected a full member of the Göttingen Academy of Sciences. From 1983 until his retirement in 1992, he held the chair for the philosophy of natural sciences in Heidelberg.

== Bibliography ==
(in English)

- The logical analysis of quantum mechanics, Pergamon, New York, 1973.
- The reduction of physical theories, Part 1. Springer Nature, Cham, Switzerland 2022. (Translated by Brigitte Falkenburg and Gregg Jaeger)

- The reduction of physical theories, Part 2. Springer Nature, Cham, Switzerland 2025. (Translated by Brigitte Falkenburg and Gregg Jaeger)

(in German)

- Die Philosophie der Physiker, Verlag C. H. Beck, Munich, 2006.
