= Hisham Ghassib =

Jordanian physicist (born 1950)

- Born: 1950 (age 75–76)
- Education: PhD in Theoretical Physics, University of Leeds, 1976

Hisham B. Ghassib is a Jordanian theoretical physicist and Marxist intellectual. He is professor of physics at the Princess Sumaya University for Technology (PSUT), where he was formerly Dean.

Ghassib gained his PhD from the University of Manchester in 1974. In 1975 he became an assistant professor in physics at the University of Jordan in Amman. He served as the first President of PSUT from 1999 to 2010, when he was succeeded by Dr Issa Batarseh. He is President of the Socialist Thought Forum. He is known for his strong anti Zionist views He is author of several books on different fields.
