= Emanuela Del Gado =

Italian theoretical physicist

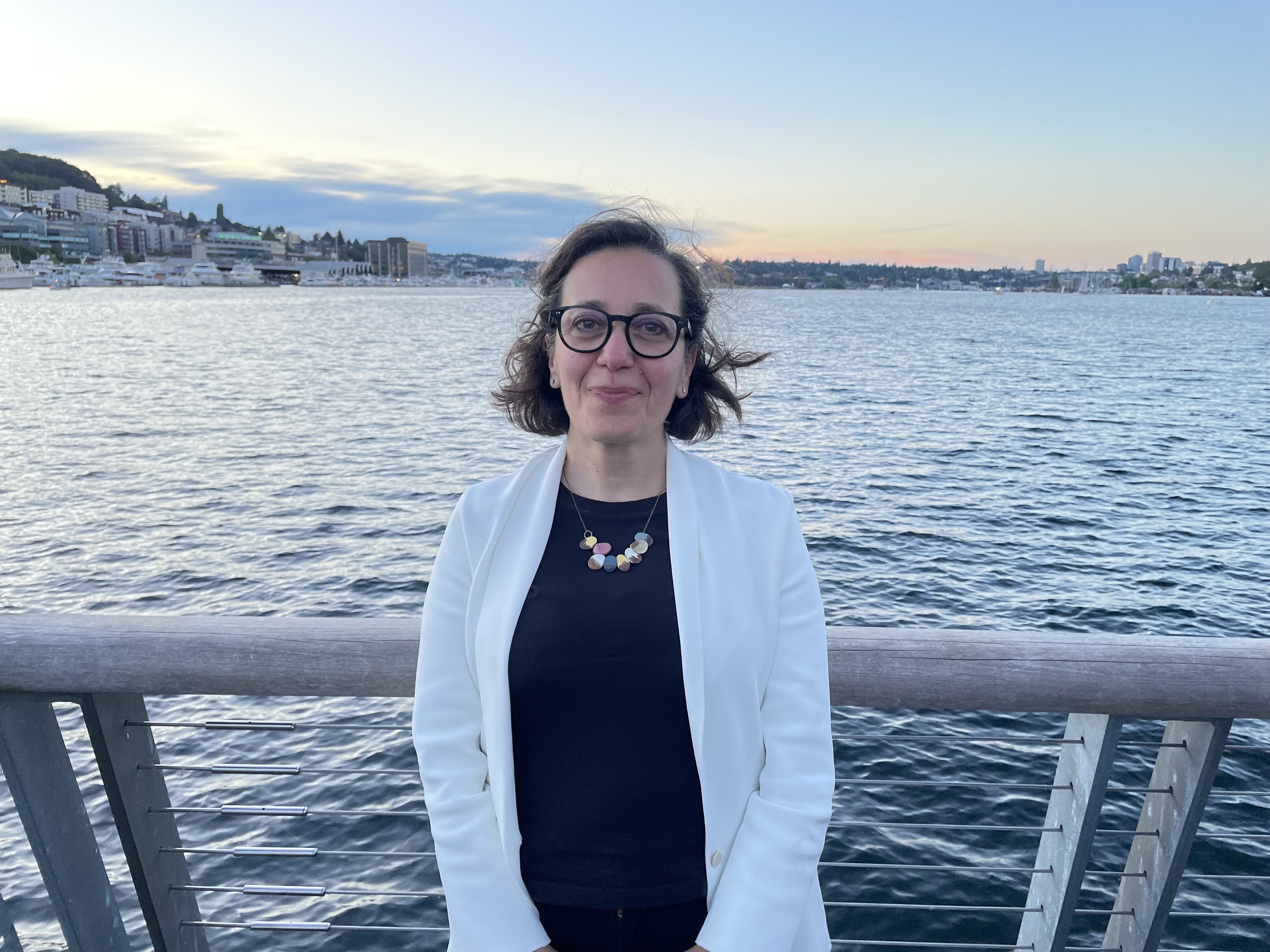
- Education: University of Naples Federico II
- Known for: Complex materials Jammed solids
- Awards: Fellow of the American Physical Society (2020); Fellow of the American Association for the Advancement of Science (2025)
- Scientific career
- Workplaces: Georgetown University; ETH Zurich; University of Montpellier II

Emanuela Del Gado is an Italian theoretical physicist and the Provost's Distinguished Professor at Georgetown University. She combines statistical mechanics and computational modelling to understand complex materials.

== Early life and education ==
Del Gado studied physics at the University of Naples Federico II. She graduated cum laude before earning her doctoral degree at the same university. Del Gado was appointed a Marie Curie Fellow in 2001, working with Walter Kob at the University of Montpellier II. She worked as a postdoctoral scholar with Hans Christian Oettinger at ETH Zurich.

== Research and career ==
In 2010 Del Gado served as a Swiss National Science Foundation Professor at ETH Zurich. In 2012 she was elected to AcademiaNet. She joined Georgetown University in 2014, where she is a member of the Department of Physics and Institute for Soft Matter. Her work includes statistical physics and computational theory. She uses modelling and numerical simulations to investigate materials with structural and dynamical complexity; which include amorphous solids, gels and glasses, as well as new green formulations of cements. Gel networks are ubiquitous in nature, and their adaptive and tunable rheological are central to their biological function. Gel networks can be stretched, flow, squeezed or fractured, but a fundamental understanding of such processes is still lacking. Del Gado's group have developed novel theoretical and computational approaches, as well as investigating how the topology of the gel network can determine softening, strain-hardening and brittleness. She has studied how different structural constituents and frozen-in stresses can modify the gel mechanics, and used this understanding to explain experimental observations in a range of materials.

Del Gado uses a spatio-temporal analysis of the microscopic dynamics in jammed soft solids. She showed the rate dependent yielding and flow in jammed materials originates from qualitatively different statistical processes. She demonstrated that frozen-in stresses control the emergence and the persistence of flow inhomogeneities. She also showed that gap growth and permeability increase in endothelial monolayers is similar to yielding in jammed soft materials. It originates from plastic processes that require cooperation across several cells and the mismatch in the inter-cellular stress alignment (Stress Orientational Defects) can help predict the loci of gap growth.

Cooperative dynamics that emerge during solidification and ageing of soft materials are crucial to their mechanical behavior. To elucidate the role of soft modes, structural heterogeneities and topology, the Del Gado group devised a novel spatio-temporal analysis of these dynamics. They identified the fundamental mechanism governing spatio-temporal correlations and fluctuations in soft solids and at the origin of their ageing. This soft solids include biopolymer networks, microgels, protein gels and even metallic glasses. Del Gado demonstrated that large stress heterogeneities frozen-in during solidification can result in microscopic ruptures and rearrangements, which are due to the elasticity stored in the material structure, which produces intermittent and strongly correlated dynamics.

Del Gado has contributed to the new theoretical description of amorphous solids. In particular, she has studied the material properties of concrete and cement. She has worked on more green, sustainable cement. She developed the first quantitative model and computational approach for gelation and densification of cement hydrate gels that form in early stages of cement hydration and are crucial to mechanics and hygro-thermal behavior of cement and concrete. Using Monte Carlo simulations and molecular dynamics Del Gado studied cement formation, finding the early-stage gelation is crucial in attaining its unique strength. Her research has reconciled contrasting experimental findings and set the path to pursue scientifically guided optimisation of cement properties, opening new possibilities for effective novel formulations of green cements.

=== Academic service ===
She was appointed the 2017 Provost's Distinguished Associate Professor in recognition of her contributions to excellence and teaching. She serves on the advisory board of DoDyNet, a group who look to advance responsible polymer research. Del Gado is a member of the American Physical Society Executive Committee on soft matter. Del Gado is the associate editor of the Journal of Rheology, and a member of the editorial boards of Frontiers in Physics and the Journal of Physics: Materials.

== Honors ==
In 2020, Del Gado was elected Fellow of the American Physical Society. In 2023, Del Gado was elected Fellow of The Society of Rheology. In 2025, she was elected Fellow of the American Association for the Advancement of Science.
