= Mikhail Feigelman =

Russian physicist

Mikhail Viktorovich Feigelman (Russian: Михаи́л Ви́кторович Фейгельман; born 11 June 1954) is a Russian physicist from the Landau Institute for Theoretical Physics. He was awarded the status of Fellow in the American Physical Society, after he was nominated by their Division of Condensed Matter Physics in 2007, for contributions to the theory of disordered materials, in particular to pinned charge density waves, spin glasses, pinned vortices in superconductors, glass formation in systems without quenched disorder, and disordered superconductor-normal metal structures.

He has a degree in chemistry from the Moscow Institute of Physics and Technology.

== See also ==
- List of fellows of the American Physical Society (1998–2010)
