= Tommy Ohlsson =

Tommy Ohlsson (born 13 June 1973) is a Swedish physicist. He is a full professor in theoretical physics with specialization in elementary particle physics at the Royal Institute of Technology (KTH) in Stockholm, Sweden, situated at the AlbaNova University Center. His research field is theoretical particle physics, particularly neutrino physics and physics beyond the so-called Standard Model. He is an author of around hundred scientific publications and one textbook (see Publications). He has also written a popular science text about the theory of special relativity at Nobelprize.org.

Ohlsson received his PhD at KTH in 2000 and was a postdoc at the Technical University of Munich, Munich, Germany, between 2000 and 2002. He is employed at KTH since 2002 and was promoted to full professor in 2008. In 2003, he was awarded the Gustafsson Prize for young researchers at Uppsala University and KTH by the Göran Gustafsson Foundation. Between 2005 and 2009, he held a research fellow position at the Royal Swedish Academy of Sciences (KVA), which was funded by the Knut and Alice Wallenberg Foundation (KAW).

In December 2012, Ohlsson was elected for a four-year term (2013–2016) to serve on arXiv's member advisory board as one of eight voting members from the contributing organizations.

Since 1 January 2014 Ohlsson is the coordinating editor of the scientific journal Nuclear Physics B, which focuses on the domain of high-energy physics, quantum field theory, statistical systems, and mathematical physics.

== Publications ==
- Publications listed in the database Inspire
- Tommy Ohlsson, Relativistic Quantum Physics - From Advanced Quantum Mechanics to Introductory Quantum Field Theory, Cambridge (2011). ISBN 978-0-521-76726-2
