= Eduard A. Kuraev =

Soviet and Russian theoretical physicist

Eduard Alekseevich Kuraev
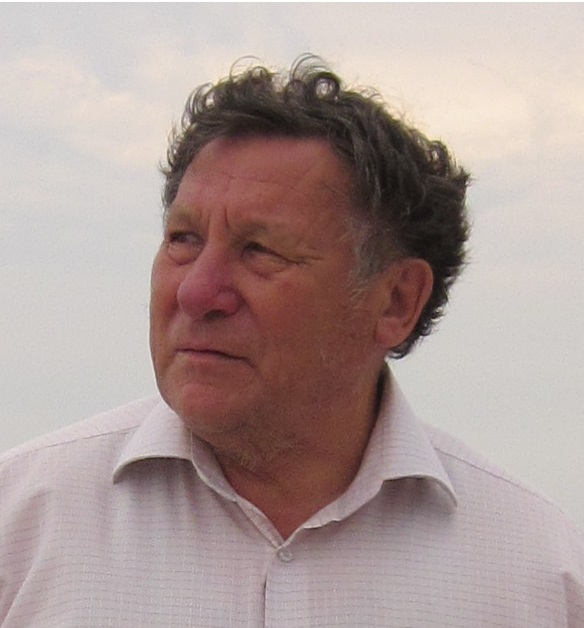
- prof. Kuraev (Canada, 2012)
- Born: 17 October 1940; Apsheronsk, Krasnodar Krai, USSR
- Died: 4 March 2014 (aged 73); Dubna, Moscow region, Russia
- Citizenship: Russia
- Education: National University of Kharkiv
- Known for: BFKL equation
- Scientific career
- Fields: Quantum field theory, Particle physics
- Workplaces: Kharkiv Institute of Physics and Technology (KIPT); Budker Institute of Nuclear Physics (BINP); Joint Institute for Nuclear Research (JINR)
- Patrons: Aleksander Akhiezer

Eduard Alekseevich Kuraev (Russian: Эдуа́рд Алексе́евич Кура́ев; October 17, 1940 in Apsheronsk – March 4, 2014 in Dubna) — Soviet and Russian theoretical physicist. Doctor of Physical and Mathematical Sciences (1971).

== Biography ==
Eduard A. Kuraev was born in Apsheronsk, Krasnodar region. In 1957 he graduated from high school in stanitsa Tbilisskaya, Krasnodar Region and entered the Faculty of Physics and Mathematics of University of Kharkov in Kharkov, Ukraine. After graduating from the university in 1962 he was sent to work to the theoretical division of the Kharkiv Institute of Physics and Technology, where he worked as an intern researcher, junior researcher and researcher until 1971.

From 1971 to 1991 he worked as a senior and leading researcher of the Department of Theoretical Physics at the Institute of Nuclear Physics of the Siberian Branch of the Academy of Sciences, Novosibirsk.

From 1991 to 2014 he worked at the Laboratory of Theoretical Physics of the Joint Institute for Nuclear Research, Dubna, in the position of master and chief scientific officer.

In 1971 he defended his doctoral thesis on «The inelastic processes of quantum electrodynamics at high energies». In 1985 he received the diploma of senior researcher and in 2005 the title of professor.

== Scientific activity ==
Eduard Kuraev was a well–known expert in the field of quantum field theory and elementary particle physics. He is an author of over 250 scientific papers, including 2 monographs.

The main scientific results of Eduard Kuraev are:

- Calculated the differential and total cross sections for the processes of quantum electrodynamics, reaching into an electron–positron, the electron–proton, electron–photon and photon–photon colliding beams (colliders).
- Obtained a system of equations of the renormalization-group operators in quantum electrodynamics which is the basis of the method of structure functions to calculate radiative corrections to the cross sections of different processes with the accuracy required by modern experiments. The method is applied to a number of processes studied at colliders.
- In the framework of QCD processes in peripheral kinematics proved fair description in terms of the gluon Regge trajectories. The equation for the amplitude of the inelastic interactions of hadrons at high energies — the equation of Balitsky–Fadin–Kuraev–Lipatov (BFKL) equation (named after Ian Balitsky, Victor Fadin, Kuraev and Lev Lipatov).
- Constructed a system of equations of evolution operators twist 2 and 3 in the various field theories — scalar and vector electrodynamics, quantum chromodynamics. Developed the procedure of constructing the equations of evolution operators of arbitrary twist.
- Сonducted a number of high–precision calculations of the cross sections of processes and decay widths of the particles in the Standard Model of electroweak interactions.

Edward Kuraev was co-leader of the project «Standard Model and its extensions» in the Laboratory of Theoretical Physics at JINR. He was known as an expert on the calculation of radiative corrections in the framework of the Standard Model. He participated in the expert group on the formation of the scientific program of physical facilities like Panda (DESY, Germany), BES III (Beijing, China), CMD2 (Novosibirsk, Russia).

For 30 years E.A. Kuraev had an intense pedagogical activity — read lectures of theoretical physics at the Moscow Institute of Radio Electronics and Automation (Technical University) and Kuban State University, was the head of 8 postgraduates. He produced several manuals for students and postgraduates — the statistical and mathematical physics, the Standard Model, the theory of strings, the physics of low–energy mesons. He also actively participated in various schools for graduate students and young scientists are regularly presented papers and lectures at the Winter school PNPI (Saint–Petersburg), Baikal Young Scientists School on Fundamental Physics (Irkutsk), schools on topical problems of physics of the microworld (Gomel, Belarus). He repeatedly performed at the Academic Council BLTP, made presentations at scientific conferences and seminars in Russia and abroad.

E.A. Kuraev participated in the organizational activities of JINR. He made presentations at the Scientific Council. He was the head of the weekly scientific seminar on the physics of hadrons in BLTP.

E.A. Kuraev was the winner of the publishing house MAIK «Nauka / Interperiodica» for the series of articles «photoproduction processes and decays of mesons. The description in the framework of local Nambu–Jona–Lasinio and Standard Model» in 2009.
