= Victor Fadin =

Russian physicist

Victor Sergeevich Fadin
- Victor Fadin Lecturing QCD in BINP, Spring 2014
- Born: 28 November 1942 (age 83); Poperechnoe, Novosibirsk oblast, USSR
- Citizenship: Russia
- Education: Novosibirsk State University
- Known for: BFKL equation
- Awards: Humboldt Prize (2001); Заслуженный работник высшей школы Российской Федерации (2006); Pomeranchuk Prize (2015)
- Scientific career
- Fields: Physics
- Workplaces: Novosibirsk State University (NSU); Budker Institute of Nuclear Physics (BINP)
- Thesis: (1983)
- Doctoral advisor: Vladimir Nicolaevich Baier

Victor Sergeevich Fadin (Russian: Виктор Сергеевич Фадин; born 28 November 1942, Poperechnoe village, Novosibirsk oblast) is a Russian physicist, well known for his contributions to theoretical physics and particle physics. He is a principal researcher at Budker Institute of Nuclear Physics (BINP) and professor of theoretical physics at Novosibirsk State University (NSU).

== Biography ==
Victor S. Fadin was born in Poperechnoe village in Novosibirsk oblast on 28 November 1942. He graduated from NSU in 1965 and joined V. N. Baier's group in BINP Theory division. In 1983 he received his doctor of Science degree from BINP and in 1993 he became professor of theoretical physics. From 2001 to 2012 he worked as head of BINP Theory division. He is a principal researcher of BINP Theory division now.

Since 1967 Victor Fadin has been working at NSU theoretical physics chair. From 1991 to 1997 he was dean of NSU Physics department. In 2011 NSU elected him distinguished professor. Now he delivers lectures on Quantum electrodynamics and Theory of strong interactions for graduate students and teaches Quantum mechanics to undergraduate students. Victor Fadin is an editor of theoretical and mathematical physics section of Vestnik NSU magazine.

V. S. Fadin is married. He has a son and a daughter.

== Academic achievements ==
Fadin is an expert in quantum field theory (QFT) and an author of more than 190 academic papers including 2 monographs, which have collected over 12 000 citations. In 2001 he received The Humboldt Prize in physics and in 2006 he was given the Russian Federation honorific title "Заслуженный работник высшей школы Российской Федерации". In 2015 Victor Fadin was awarded the Pomeranchuk Prize "for his results devoted to high energy processes in QED and QCD". He shared the 2015 prize with professor Stanley J. Brodsky.

He was one of the first to theoretically study a number of QED processes observed at the pioneering colliders VEP-1 and VEPP-2 in Novosibirsk. He worked out the structure function method for calculation of QED radiative corrections to cross sections of electron-positron annihilation and electron-nucleus scattering processes. Moreover, he developed the method of quasi-real particles, which was the first step to the parton picture in QFT.

Professor Fadin's main contributions to QCD comprise the description of the coherence effects in the soft gluon emission and the study of the energy behavior of amplitudes in the Regge limit. The latter lead him to the development of Reggeization theory and the formulation of the Balitsky–Kuraev–Fadin–Lipatov (BFKL) evolution equation for high-energy amplitudes (named after Ian Balitsky, Eduard A. Kuraev, Fadin and Lev Lipatov). The BFKL equation predicted the rise of QCD cross sections as the colliding energy increases, which was later observed at HERA collider. This success established the BFKL approach as the basis of the modern theory of semi-hard processes in QCD. In recent years V. S. Fadin with his colleagues developed the BFKL approach in the next to leading logarithm approximation. Among his other achievements is the investigation of Coulomb effects in W+W- production.

== Awards ==
- Humboldt Prize (2001)
- Заслуженный работник высшей школы Российской Федерации (2006)
- Pomeranchuk Prize (2015)
