= MTZ =

MTZ may refer to

- Manuel Turizo Zapata, Colombian singer also known as MTZ
- Minsk Tractor Works, or Minski Traktarny Zavod (MTZ / МТЗ)
- Mantle transition zone

== See also ==
- MTZ-RIPO, Belarusian football club established in 2002, later renamed Partizan-MTZ Minsk and nw now renamed FC Partizan Minsk
- MTZ black hole, a black hole solution for (3+1)-dimensional gravity with a minimally coupled self-interacting scalar field, named after Cristian Martinez, Ricardo Troncoso and Jorge Zanelli
- Martinez station, an Amtrak station stop in Martinez, California
