= 2+1 =

2+1 may refer to:

- 3

In physics

- 2+1 road
- 2+1 dimensions
- (2+1)-dimensional topological gravity, found in (String theory, Quantum gravity)

In music

- 2 Plus 1, a Polish band
