= Michael Riordan (physicist) =

American physicist and science writer

Michael Riordan (born 3 December 1946) is an American physicist, science historian and author.

Riordan earned his doctorate from the Massachusetts Institute of Technology in 1973. He worked at the University of Rochester, then moved to the SLAC National Accelerator Laboratory and concurrently held an adjunct professorship at the University of California, Santa Cruz. While associated with SLAC, Riordan was elected a fellow of the American Physical Society and received a Guggenheim Fellowship in 1999. The American Institute of Physics honored Riordan with the 2002 Andrew Gemant Award.

== Selected publications ==
- Riordan, Michael; Hoddeson, Lillian; Kolb, Adrienne (2015). Tunnel Visions: The Rise and Fall of the Superconducting Super Collider. University of Chicago Press. ISBN 978-0-226-29479-7.
- Riordan, Michael; Hoddeson, Lillian (1997). Crystal Fire: The Invention of the Transistor and the Birth of the Information Age. W. W. Norton Company. ISBN 978-0-393-31851-7.
- Hoddeson, Lillian; Brown, Laurie; Riordan, Michael; Dresden, Max (1997-11-13). The Rise of the Standard Model. Cambridge University Press. ISBN 0-521-57082-4.
- Riordan, Michael; Schramm, David N. (1991). The Shadows of Creation: Dark Matter and the Structure of the Universe. W. H. Freeman & Company. ISBN 978-0-7167-2157-4.
- Riordan, Michael (1987). The Hunting of the Quark: A True Story of Modern Physics. Simon & Schuster. ISBN 978-0-671-64884-8. Revised and updated electronic edition published in 2018 by Plunkett Lake Press.
- Anderson, Bruce; Riordan, Michael; Wong, Edward A.; Dutton, Rachel (1976). The solar home book : heating, cooling, and designing with the sun. Harrisville, N.H.: Cheshire Books. ISBN 0-917352-01-7. OCLC 2684642.
