= James Cushing =

James Cushing may refer to:

- James M. Cushing (1908–1963), US Army mining engineer
- James T. Cushing (1937–2002), American physicist and philosopher of science
