= Ales Pushkin =

Belarusian artist (1965–2023)

- Алесь Пушкін
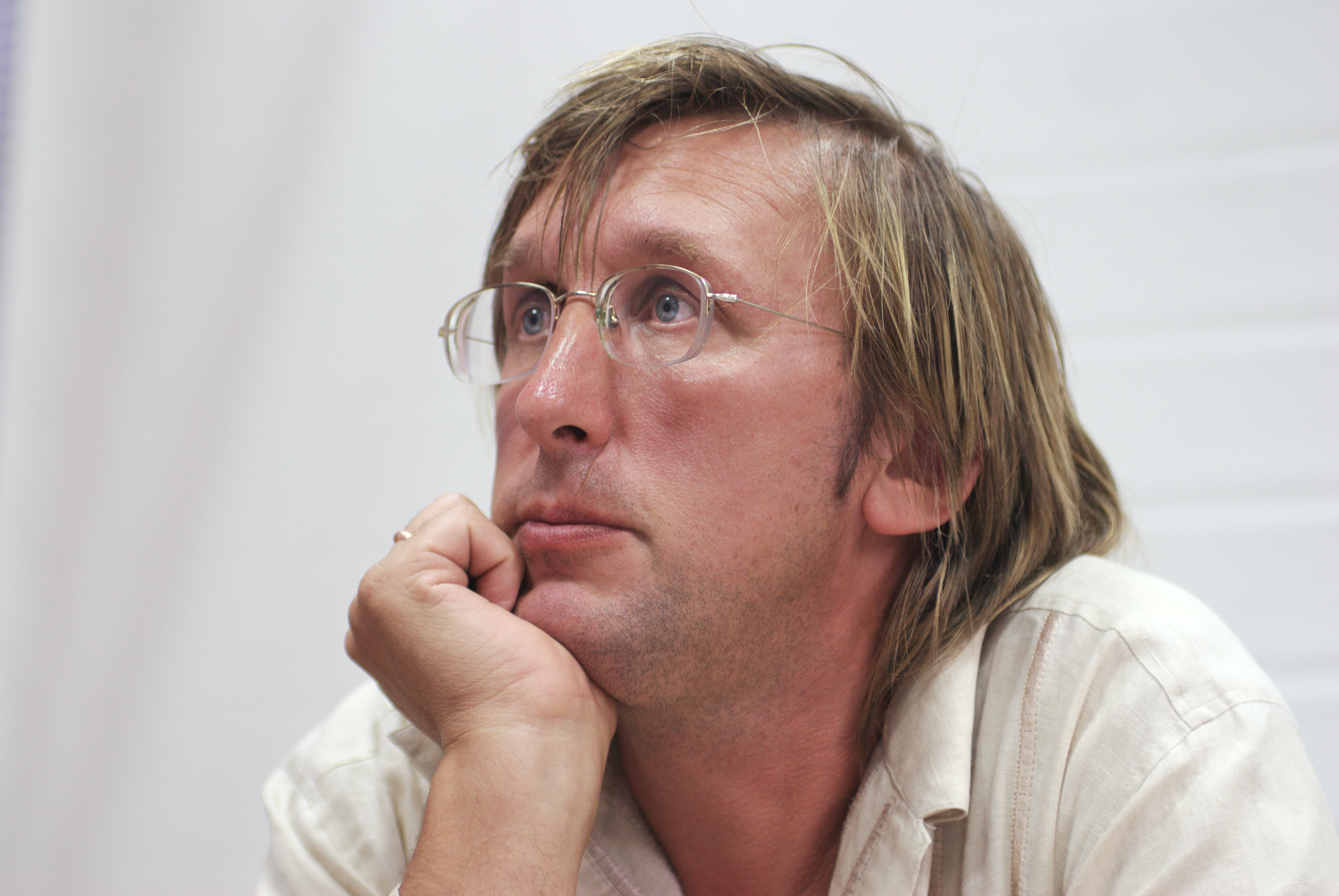
- Born: 6 August 1965; Bobr, Krupki District, Minsk Oblast, Belarusian SSR, USSR
- Died: 11 July 2023 (aged 57)
- Education: Belarusian State Academy of Arts
- Occupations: Activist, artist, curator
- Awards: Belarusian Democratic Republic 100th Jubilee Medal
- Website: http://pushkin.by

Ales Pushkin (né Aliaksandr Mikalaevich Pushkin; Belarusian Алесь Пушкін; 6 August 1965 – 11 July 2023) was a Belarusian non-conformist painter, theater artist, performer, art curator, and political prisoner. He was a member of the Belarusian Union of Artists.

== Biography ==
=== Education ===
In 1978, at the age of 13, Pushkin enrolled in the Republican Boarding School for Fine Arts for talented children named after I.O. Akhremchik in Belarus. His class teacher was Peter Sharyp. After graduating the school in 1983, Pushkin continued his studies in monumental and decorative art at the Belarusian State Theater and Art Institute. In 1984, he was drafted into the Soviet army. He served in Afghanistan and was demobilized in 1986, after which he resumed his studies at the Art Institute. In 1990, for his diploma, he created a monumental painting "The History of His School" in the lobby of the Republican Boarding School for Fine Arts. The painting covered an area of 215 square meters and took six months to complete; it is still displayed there. The painting depicts Francisk Skorina, Mikhail Kleofas Oginsky, Adam Mitskevich, Andrei Tarkovsky, and Vladimir Vysotsky. For this work he was admitted to the Union of Artists of the USSR.

=== Social movement ===
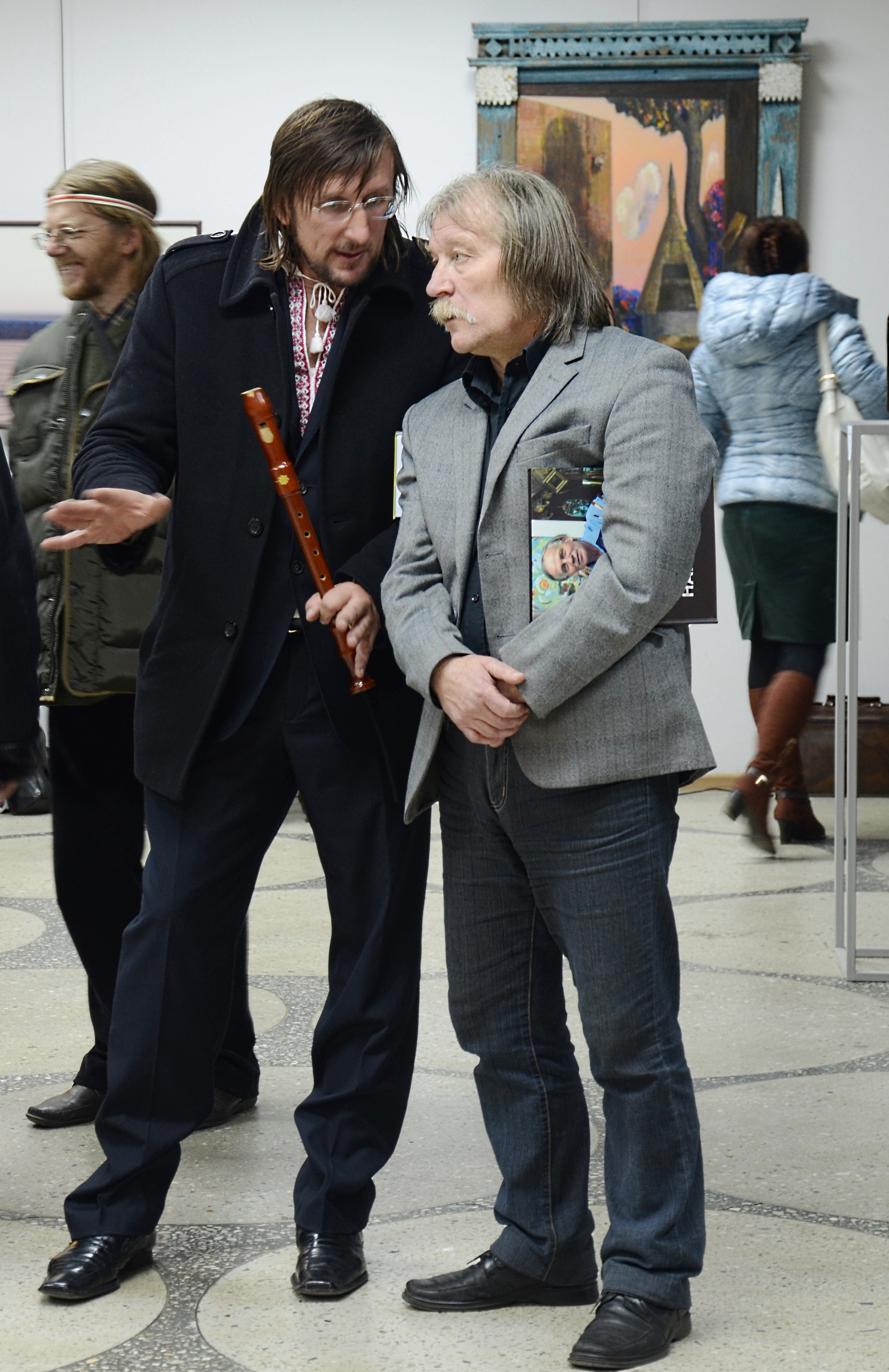
Ales Pushkin (left) and Belarusian artist, Grigoriy Sitnitsa 2014.

In addition to the active art exhibition that began during perestroika, Ales Pushkin took an active part in the Belarusian movement of national revival. It was the time of the emergence in Belarus of such historical and cultural youth organizations as "Toloka", which engaged in the restoration of monuments, and educational activities related to the revival of the Belarusian language and national symbols. In 1988, as a 4th-year university student, Ales Pushkin organized the first circle of the Belarusian Popular Front.

Pushkin was a laureate of the second Charter'97 National Human Rights Prize in the category “For Courage in Art” (1999).

=== Arrests ===
In 1988, for participation in organizing a rally timed to coincide with the autumn Day of Remembrance of Ancestors, Ales Pushkin was arrested for 15 days. On 25 March 1989, during the celebration of the 71st anniversary of the founding of the Belarusian People's Republic, Ales Pushkin carried out the first manifesto of Social Art in Belarus: 12 posters that contradict the state ideology were planned to be displayed in front of the Belarusian Government House. One of the posters depicted the BSSR flag from 1951 with an inscription in Belarusian "Dosyts 'satsyalistychnaya', adrodzim people's Belarus!" ("Enough 'socialistic', let's revive people's Belarus!"). A group of protesters walked from the Theater Institute to the House of Press, where the artist was arrested along with 130 people. The authorities reacted with a campaign in the press against the artist. On 31 March 1989, the Presidium of the Supreme Soviet of the BSSR by decree amended the Administrative Code: increased responsibility for the use of unregistered symbols, such as flags, emblems, and pennants. Pushkin was sentenced to two years of probation and five years of disqualification.

As the author of the manifesto of Social Art, Pushkin carried out his first high-profile performance in 1989, for which he was sentenced to two years of probation; he conducted more than a dozen performances thereafter. The most famous of them is "Pus for a President" (1999), during which Ales Pushkin overturned a cart with manure in front of the administration of Lukashenko. For this performance, the artist was sentenced to two years of probation.

=== Vitebsk period ===
After graduation, Pushkin was assigned to work in Vitebsk, Belarus. Over time, having found premises for his own workshop, he began to prepare the exhibition “Social Art. Declarative Art ". The exhibition was preceded by the performances "November 7", "Vitebsk Behind Jail Bars", "Spring", "Liberty", and "Love". Another manifesto of Social Art was declared on 25 March 1991, on Freedom Day, when Ales Pushkin rode around Vitebsk on a donkey, holding a dove, to the sounds of a brass band. Then, the dove was released with the words: “It will bring us freedom!"

On 23 March 1993, in Vitebsk, Pushkin opened one of the first private non-commercial galleries of contemporary art in Belarus, "At Pushkin", which existed until 1997. The gallery was about 50 square meters and was located near the Marc Chagall Museum.

Ales Pushkin designed the stage and costume designer for the 7th International Festival of Contemporary Choreography held in Vitebsk in 1994. He was also engaged in scenography at the Yakub Kolas Belarusian Drama Theater, and was a designer for such performances as "King Lear" by W. Shakespeare (director V. Maslyuk, 1993–94), "Frocken Julia" by Y.A. Strindberg (director A. Grishkevich, 1997), and "Nobody Writes to the Colonel" by G.G. Marquez (2001).

=== Religious art ===
Simultaneously with his activities in Vitebsk, Pushkin carried out the restoration and renovation of church murals in the Mogilev Church of St. Stanislav (now the Cathedral of the Assumption of the Virgin Mary). Some of the murals have presently been removed for political reasons. Many famous Belarusian politicians and church members, including Zenon Poznyak, were included in the paintings.

In 1996, Pushkin painted the monumental walls of the Orthodox church in his native village of Bobr, which was rebuilt after its destruction in 1936. The theme of the painting was the episode of Judgment Day and had a political connotation. On the right hand of Christ there were the righteous, on the left there were the sinners. The angel was blowing the horn. The faces of the sinners bore a resemblance to real people, namely the Metropolitan Filaret and the President of Belarus, Alexander Lukashenko. After the fresco was shown on the RTR TV program “Vesti Nedeli” in 2005, the church authorities sent Archpriest of the Minsk diocese Nikolai Korzhich to Bobr, under whose supervision the scandalous part of the wall painting was removed. By a strange coincidence, this wooden church burned down after it was consecrated by Metropolitan Filaret on 17 February 2011. The church was rebuilt with bricks. Ales Pushkin married his wife in the church in 1997.

== Prosecution (2021) ==
On 26 March 2021, the General Prosecutor's Office of Belarus opened a criminal case against the artist for showing a portrait of anti-Soviet underground figure Yevgeny Zhikhar at an exhibition in the Grodno Center for Urban Life. The prosecutor's office saw this as a "rehabilitation of Nazism", even though the painting was painted back in 2014 and subsequently exhibited in Russia and Belarus. Pushkin found out about the criminal case but did not cancel the flight from Ukraine, where he had an exhibition, and in the evening of the same day he returned home. At night, his workshop was searched. On 29 March, Pushkin was fired from Belrestavratsia, where he worked. The next day he was arrested.

On 6 April 2021, by a joint statement of eight organizations, including the Viasna Human Rights Centre, the Belarusian Association of Journalists, the Belarusian Helsinki Committee, Pushkin was recognized as a political prisoner. On 30 April 2021, godparenthood for Pushkin was undertaken by Camilla Hansén, Member of the Riksdag.

On 30 March 2022, Pushkin was handed a five-year prison sentence for "incitement to racial, national or religious hatred".

== Death ==
Pushkin died at the age of 57 on 11 July 2023 in a hospital where he was urgently transferred from a prison facility.

== Bibliography ==
- The Belarusian Alexander Pushkin: holy fool, dissident performance artist
- Алесь Пушкин
- Пушкин в Белоруссии: как художник хулиганов «достал» (in Russian)
- Свободные Новости Плюс: «Наш Пушкин: талантливый, эпатажный, ультрасовременный» (in Russian)
- Свободные Новости Плюс: «Наш Пушкин: талантливый, эпатажный, ультрасовременный» (in Russian)
- Художник Алесь Пушкин: «Второй раз тачку навоза под окна Лукашенко не привез бы» (in Russian)
- На свободу вышел художник Алесь Пушкин
- Ales Pushkin's paintings
