= Laurie Brown (physicist) =

American theoretical physicist and historian (1923–2019)

Laurie Mark Brown (April 10, 1923 – October 25, 2019) was an American theoretical physicist and historian of quantum field theory and elementary particle physics.

== Life and career ==
Laurie Mark Brown was born in Kings, New York on April 10, 1923. He studied at Cornell University, where in 1951 he received his Ph.D. under Richard Feynman. From 1950 he was on the faculty of the physics department of Northwestern University, where he became a tenured professor and eventually retired as professor emeritus. For the academic year 1952–1953 he was at the Institute for Advanced Study. For the academic years 1958–1959 and 1959–1960 he was a Fulbright Scholar in Italy. In 1966 he was an IEA professor at the University of Vienna. From 1960 to 1970 he served as a consultant for Argonne National Laboratory and the Laboratory's Accelerator Committee.

Brown was one of the leading science historians for the development of quantum field theory and elementary particle physics, especially in the era after 1945. During the 1990s one focus of his work was the history of modern physics in Japan.

He was the editor for Feynman's Thesis: A New Approach to Quantum Physics (2005), Selected Papers of Richard Feynman, with Commentary (2000), and (with John Rigden as co-editor) Most of the Good Stuff: Memories of Richard Feynman (1993).

Brown was one of the founders of the Forum on History of Physics of the American Physical Society and was the chair of the Forum in 1984 and again in 1989. He was a member of the American Association for the Advancement of Science and a member of the History of Science Society. In 1961 he was elected a Fellow of the American Physical Society.

Brown died on October 25, 2019, at the age of 96.

== Selected publications ==
- Brown, Laurie M. (1958). "Two-component fermion theory". Phys. Rev. 111 (3): 957–965. Bibcode:1958PhRv..111..957B. doi:10.1103/PhysRev.111.957.
- as editor with Lillian Hoddeson: The birth of particle physics (International Symposium on the history of particle physics, Fermilab 1980). Cambridge University Press. 1983.; Brown, Laurie M.; Hoddeson, Lillian (1986). pbk. edition. CUP Archive. ISBN 9780521338370.
- with Donald F. Moyer: Brown, Laurie M.; Moyer, Donald F. (1984). "Lady or tiger?—The Meitner–Hupfeld effect and Heisenberg's neutron theory". American Journal of Physics. 52 (2): 130–136. Bibcode:1984AmJPh..52..130B. doi:10.1119/1.13920.
- with Max Dresden and Lillian Hoddeson: Pions to Quarks: Particle physics in the 1950s (based on a Fermilab symposium). Cambridge University Press. 1989.
- with Tian Yu Cao: Brown, Laurie M.; Cao, Tian Yu (1991). "Spontaneous breakdown of symmetry: Its rediscovery and integration into quantum field theory". Historical Studies in the Physical and Biological Sciences. 21 (2): 211–235. doi:10.2307/27757663. JSTOR 27757663.
- as editor: Renormalization: from Lorentz to Landau and beyond. Springer. 1993.
- as editor with Abraham Pais and Brian Pippard: Twentieth Century Physics. Vol. 3 vols. (2nd ed.). IOP. 1995.
- with Helmut Rechenberg: Origin of the concept of nuclear forces. Taylor and Francis. 1996. ISBN 9780750303736.
- as editor with Lillian Hoddeson, Michael Riordan, and Max Dresden: The rise of the standard model. A history of particle physics from 1964 to 1979. Cambridge University Press. 1997. ISBN 9780521578165.
- Brown, Laurie M. (2002). "The Compton Effect as One Path to QED". Studies in History and Philosophy of Modern Physics. 3 (2): 211–249. Bibcode:2002SHPMP..33..211B. doi:10.1016/S1355-2198(02)00005-9.
- Brown, Laurie M. (2006). "Paul A. M. Dirac's Principles of Quantum Mechanics". Physics in Perspective. 8 (4): 381–407. Bibcode:2006PhP.....8..381B. doi:10.1007/s00016-006-0276-4. S2CID 120303937.
