= Catherine Westfall =

American historian of science

Catherine Lee Westfall is an American historian of science known for her work documenting the history of the United States Department of Energy national laboratories.

== Education and career ==
Westfall completed a Ph.D. at Michigan State University in 1988; her doctoral dissertation was The First Truly National Laboratory: The Birth of Fermilab.

As well as working within the laboratories to document their history, Westfall taught at the Lyman Briggs College of Michigan State University beginning in 2008.

== Books ==
With Lillian Hoddeson and Adrienne Kolb, Westfall is the coauthor of the book Fermilab: Physics, the Frontier, and Megascience (University of Chicago Press, 2008).

With Hoddeson, Paul W. Henriksen, and Roger A. Meade, she is the coauthor of Critical Assembly: A Technical History of Los Alamos During the Oppenheimer Years, 1943–1945 (Cambridge University Press, 1993).

== Recognition ==
In 2009, Westfall was named as a Fellow of the American Physical Society (APS), after a nomination from the APS Forum on the History of Physics, "for her pioneering historical research on five American national laboratories, and for her organizational work in the history of physics, especially in the productive ongoing series of Laboratory History Conferences".
