= Jorge Zanelli =

Chilean theoretical physicist

- Education: University of Santiago; San Sebastián University; Stony Brook University (PhD, 1982)
- Known for: BTZ black hole; Chern–Simons gravity and supergravity
- Awards: Guggenheim Fellowship (1997)
- Scientific career
- Fields: Theoretical physics
- Workplaces: Centro de Estudios Científicos; University of Chile; University of Santiago
- Thesis: Studies in Supersymmetry and Cosmology (1982)
- Doctoral advisor: Max Dresden

Jorge Zanelli Iglesias is a Chilean theoretical physicist who works at the Centro de Estudios Científicos (CECs) in Valdivia with a joint appointment at Universidad San Sebastian. His research deals with gravitation, black holes and supergravity. With Máximo Bañados and Claudio Teitelboim (now Claudio Bunster) he found the BTZ black hole solution in 1992.

In 2007 Zanelli was appointed as an advisor for the Chilean government on nuclear energy. He led a working group on nuclear power convened by President Michelle Bachelet, and he served several terms on the council of the Chilean Nuclear Energy Commission.

== Education ==
Zanelli studied physics at the University of Chile, in Santiago. He received a PhD from the State University of New York at Stony Brook in 1982, supervised by Max Dresden. His thesis studied supersymmetry in cosmological models. He later spent two years as a postdoctoral fellow at the International Centre for Theoretical Physics in Trieste, working on the quantum aspects of cosmological models.

== Career ==
Zanelli was an associate professor at the University of Chile from 1985 to 1995 and a professor at the University of Santiago from 1995 to 2001. He is currently a researcher at CECs and at San Sebastian University. He received a Guggenheim Fellowship in 1997.

== Research ==
=== Black holes in three dimensions ===
In 1992 Bañados, Teitelboim and Zanelli showed that general relativity in two space dimensions and one time dimension, with a negative cosmological constant, has a black-hole solution. In a 1993 paper with Marc Henneaux, the four authors showed that the solution has constant negative curvature and is obtained from anti-de Sitter space by identifying points under a discrete group of its symmetries. The solution shares many features of the Kerr black hole, among them an event horizon, an inner horizon, an ergosphere and a non-zero Hawking temperature, while being simple enough that many quantum calculations can be done exactly, which is not practical in four spacetime dimensions. In 1998 Andrew Strominger computed the entropy of black holes of this kind from the growth of the number of quantum states and found precise agreement with the Bekenstein–Hawking formula. Zanelli and his collaborators later found a charged rotating version of the solution and exact black-hole solutions with scalar fields in three and four dimensions. Four-dimensional black holes with a scalar field and a negative cosmological constant found by Martínez, Troncoso and Zanelli are known as MTZ black holes.

=== Higher-dimensional gravity and Chern–Simons supergravity ===
With Teitelboim, Zanelli formulated Lovelock gravity, a generalization of general relativity to higher dimensions whose field equations are still of second order, in Hamiltonian form. With Bañados and Teitelboim he found black-hole solutions of a family of these theories, which they called dimensionally continued black holes, and related their entropy to a dimensional continuation of the Gauss–Bonnet theorem. Zanelli and his collaborators constructed supersymmetric versions of these theories, among them supergravity theories in seven and eleven dimensions (with Ricardo Troncoso, 1998). He has reviewed the subject in a 2012 review article and in a 2016 book written with Mokhtar Hassaine.

=== Unconventional supersymmetry ===
In 2012, with Pedro Alvarez and Mauricio Valenzuela, Zanelli proposed a locally supersymmetric theory in 2+1 dimensions that describes gravity, the electromagnetic field and a spin-½ Dirac field. Its action is a Chern–Simons form, but the theory has no spin-3/2 gravitino, so it is not a supergravity theory, and its fields need not form supersymmetric pairs of equal mass. With Laura Andrianopoli, Mario Trigiante and others, he later derived models with this "unconventional" supersymmetry at the boundary of four-dimensional anti-de Sitter supergravity and used them to describe electronic properties of graphene-like materials.

== Public service ==
On 13 March 2007, by a decree of the Ministry of Mining, President Bachelet created a working group on nuclear electricity generation (Grupo de Trabajo en Núcleo-Electricidad) chaired by Zanelli. Its task was to advise the ministry on the opportunities, challenges and risks of using nuclear power to generate electricity in Chile. The group, dubbed the "Zanelli Commission", reported in September 2007 that the information it had examined did not allow nuclear power to be ruled out as a future energy option for Chile. According to MercoPress, the commission also concluded that Chile was not yet ready for nuclear power, institutionally or legally, and that the state would have to pay for at least part of any nuclear plant.

Zanelli was a member of the council of the Chilean Nuclear Energy Commission (CChEN) from 1998 to 2000 and from 2006 to 2010. He was appointed to the council again from November 2014 to January 2017.

== Honours ==
- 1997: Guggenheim Fellowship (natural sciences, physics)
- 2010: Medalla Orden al Mérito Científico, Región de Los Ríos
- 2014: Premio a la Trayectoria Científica, Sociedad Chilena de Física (SOCHIFI)

== Selected publications ==
- Bañados, Máximo; Teitelboim, Claudio; Zanelli, Jorge (1992). "The black hole in three-dimensional space-time". Physical Review Letters. 69 (13): 1849–1851. arXiv:hep-th/9204099. Bibcode:1992PhRvL..69.1849B. doi:10.1103/PhysRevLett.69.1849. PMID 10046331.
- Bañados, Máximo; Henneaux, Marc; Teitelboim, Claudio; Zanelli, Jorge (1993). "Geometry of the (2+1) black hole". Physical Review D. 48 (4): 1506–1525. arXiv:gr-qc/9302012. Bibcode:1993PhRvD..48.1506B. doi:10.1103/PhysRevD.48.1506. PMID 10016387.
- Teitelboim, Claudio; Zanelli, Jorge (1987). "Dimensionally continued topological gravitation theory in Hamiltonian form". Classical and Quantum Gravity. 4 (4): L125. Bibcode:1987CQGra...4L.125T. doi:10.1088/0264-9381/4/4/010.
- Bañados, Máximo; Teitelboim, Claudio; Zanelli, Jorge (1994). "Dimensionally continued black holes". Physical Review D. 49 (2): 975–986. arXiv:gr-qc/9307033. Bibcode:1994PhRvD..49..975B. doi:10.1103/PhysRevD.49.975. PMID 10017056.
- Troncoso, Ricardo; Zanelli, Jorge (1998). "New gauge supergravity in seven and eleven dimensions". Physical Review D. 58 (10) 101703. arXiv:hep-th/9710180. Bibcode:1998PhRvD..58j1703T. doi:10.1103/PhysRevD.58.101703.
- Martínez, Cristián; Troncoso, Ricardo; Zanelli, Jorge (2004). "Exact black hole solution with a minimally coupled scalar field". Physical Review D. 70 (8) 084035. arXiv:hep-th/0406111. Bibcode:2004PhRvD..70h4035M. doi:10.1103/PhysRevD.70.084035.
- Alvarez, Pedro D.; Valenzuela, Mauricio; Zanelli, Jorge (2012). "Supersymmetry of a different kind". Journal of High Energy Physics. 2012 (4): 058. arXiv:1109.3944. Bibcode:2012JHEP...04..058A. doi:10.1007/JHEP04(2012)058.
- Hassaine, Mokhtar; Zanelli, Jorge (2016). Chern–Simons (Super)Gravity. Hackensack, NJ: World Scientific. Bibcode:2016cssg.book.....H. doi:10.1142/9863. ISBN 978-981-4730-93-8.
