= Martin Gutzwiller =

Swiss-American physicist (1925–2014)

Martin C. Gutzwiller
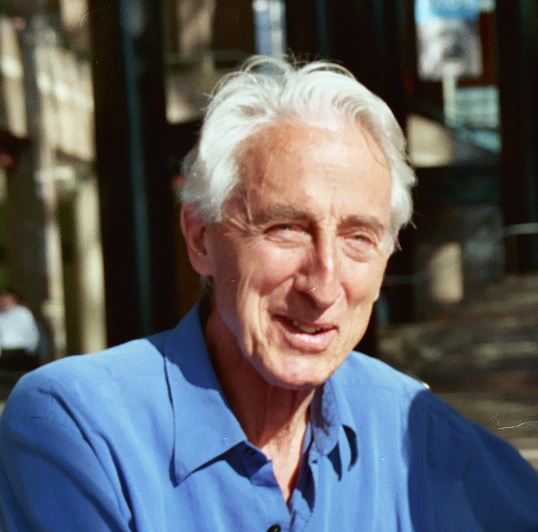
- Born: October 12, 1925; Basel, Switzerland
- Died: March 3, 2014 (aged 88); Rio Rancho, New Mexico
- Education: ETH Zurich, University of Kansas
- Known for: Gutzwiller approximation Gutzwiller trace formula Hadamard–Gutzwiller model Hubbard model
- Awards: Dannie Heineman Prize for Mathematical Physics (1993); Max Planck Medal (2003)
- Scientific career
- Fields: Quantum chaos, Complex Systems
- Workplaces: IBM, Columbia University, Yale University
- Doctoral advisor: Max Dresden

Martin Charles Gutzwiller (12 October 1925 – 3 March 2014) was a Swiss-American physicist, known for his work on field theory, quantum chaos, and complex systems. He spent most of his career at IBM Research, and was also an adjunct professor of physics at Yale University.

== Biography ==
Gutzwiller was born on October 12, 1925, in the Swiss city of Basel. He completed a Diploma degree from ETH Zurich, where he studied quantum physics under Wolfgang Pauli. He then went to the University of Kansas and completed a Ph.D under Max Dresden. After graduation, he worked on microwave engineering for Brown, Boveri & Cie, on geophysics for Shell Oil, and eventually for IBM Research in Switzerland, New York City, and Yorktown Heights, until his retirement in 1993. He also held temporary teaching appointments at Columbia University, ETH Zurich, Paris-Orsay, and Stockholm. He was Vice Chair for the Committee on Mathematical Physics, of the International Union of Pure and Applied Physics, from 1987 to 1993. He joined Yale University as adjunct professor in 1993, retaining the position until his retirement.

== Scientific work ==
Gutzwiller formulated the Gutzwiller approximation for describing electrons with strong local interactions in terms of the Gutzwiller wave function, composed of a simple many-electron wave function acted on by a correlation operator ("Gutzwiller projection"). He was also the first to investigate the relationship between classical and quantum mechanics in chaotic systems. In that context, he developed the Gutzwiller trace formula, the main result of periodic orbit theory, which gives a recipe for computing spectra from periodic orbits of a system. He is the author of the classic monograph on the subject, Chaos in Classical and Quantum Mechanics (1990).

Gutzwiller is also known for finding novel solutions to mathematical problems in field theory, wave propagation, crystal physics, and celestial mechanics. In appreciation of his contributions to theoretical physics, the Max Planck Institute for the Physics of Complex Systems (MPIPKS) annually awards the Martin Gutzwiller Fellowship to acknowledge and promote exceptional research in this field.

== Book collecting ==
Gutzwiller had an avid interest in the history of science. He eventually acquired a valuable collection of rare books on astronomy and mechanics. Shortly after his death, his collection was auctioned at Swann Galleries, in New York City. The auction took place on April 3, 2014, and raised a total of US$341,788.

== Honors ==
- Fellow of National Academies of Science in 1992
- Fellow of American Academy of Arts and Sciences in 1993
- Fellow of American Physical Society
- Dannie Heineman Prize for Mathematical Physics in 1993
- Max Planck medal in 2003
