= Max Dresden =

Dutch-American physicist

- Born: April 23, 1918; Amsterdam, Netherlands
- Died: October 29, 1997 (aged 79); Palo Alto, California, U.S.
- Education: Leiden University
- Scientific career
- Workplaces: University of Michigan; University of Kansas; Northwestern University; University of Iowa; Stony Brook University

Max Dresden (April 23, 1918, Amsterdam – October 29, 1997, Palo Alto) was a Dutch-American theoretical physicist and historian of physics. He is known for his research in "statistical mechanics, superconductivity, quantum field theory, and elementary particle physics."

== Biography ==
Dresden studied at the University of Amsterdam and at the University of Leiden, where he received the Dutch equivalent of an M.S. in 1938 and was a research assistant of H. A. Kramers. Kramers helped him get a studentship research position in 1939 at Columbia University under the supervision of Enrico Fermi. Dresden received his Ph.D. in 1946 from the University of Michigan. His thesis On the Problem of the Approach to Equilibrium in Statistical Mechanics was supervised by George Uhlenbeck. In 1949 Dresden became a US citizen.

He was from 1946 to 1957 a faculty member of the physics department of the University of Kansas, where he was eventually promoted to full professor. At Northwestern University he was from 1957 to 1960 a professor and chair of the physics department. He was a professor from 1960 to 1964 at the University of Iowa and then from 1964 until his retirement in 1989 at the State University of New York at Stony Brook (SUNY), where he headed the Institute for Theoretical Physics. He won four teaching awards at Stony Brook. After his retirement as professor emeritus, he was from 1989 at SLAC a visiting scientist and at Stanford University a consulting professor in the history of physics. At various times during his career he held visiting positions at Fermilab, the Johns Hopkins University, the Argonne National Laboratory, the CERN, and the Niels Bohr Institute in Copenhagen.

His research has spanned nearly all of theoretical physics including statistical mechanics, superconductivity, quantum field theory, the behavior of positrons, parastatistics, symmetries and S matrix theory, particle physics, nonstandard analysis, and nonlinear dynamics.

Dresden was elected a fellow of the American Association for the Advancement of Science in 1989. His doctoral students include James T. Cushing, Martin Gutzwiller, Paul Halpern, and Jorge Zanelli.

He was married twice and had four children.

== Selected publications ==
=== Articles ===
- Dresden, M.; Albano, A. (September 1967). "Nonlinear space-time transformations related to the Lorentz group". Proceedings of the National Academy of Sciences of the United States of America. 58 (3): 916–922. Bibcode:1967PNAS...58..916D. doi:10.1073/pnas.58.3.916. PMC 335725. PMID 16578680.
- Dresden, M.; Wong, D. (March 1975). "Life games and statistical models". Proceedings of the National Academy of Sciences. 72 (3): 956–960. Bibcode:1975PNAS...72..956D. doi:10.1073/pnas.72.3.956. PMC 432442. PMID 1055393.
- Dresden, Max (1988). "Kramers's contributions to statistical mechanics". Physics Today. 41 (9): 26–33. Bibcode:1988PhT....41i..26D. doi:10.1063/1.881132.
- Chapter 8. Non-equilibrium statistical mechanics or the vagaries of time evolution by Max Dresden, pages 585–633 in Laurie Brown, Abraham Pais, Brian Pippard (editors) Twentieth Century Physics, Vol. 1, 1995, IOP Publishing/AIP Press
- Chapter. On personal styles and tastes in physics by Max Dresden, in C.S. Liu, S.T. Yau (editors) Chen Ning Yang: a great physicist of the 20th century, International Press 1995

=== Books ===
- H.A. Kramers: Between Tradition and Revolution, Springer 1987 ISBN 978-1-4612-9087-2; 2012 ebook ebook ISBN 978-1-4612-4622-0
- as editor with Lillian Hoddeson and Laurie Brown: Pions to quarks: Particle physics in the 1950s, Cambridge University Press 1989
- as editor with Lillian Hoddeson, Laurie Brown, and Michael Riordan: The rise of the Standard Model: Particle physics in the 1960s and 1970s, Cambridge University Press 1997 (with an introduction by Hoddeson on The rise of the standard model 1964–1979, pp. 3–35) hbk ISBN 0-521-570-82-4; pbk ISBN 0-521-57816-7
