= Crystal Fire: The Birth of the Information Age =

Crystal Fire: The Birth of the Information Age is a book by science historians Michael Riordan and Lillian Hoddeson about the creation of modern solid-state electronics, starting with invention and development of the transistor, and ending with the invention of integrated circuit. Published by W. W. Norton in 1997, it is widely regarded as the definitive history of the transistor, for which Riordan and Hoddeson won the inaugural Sally Hacker Award of the Society for History of Technology in 1999. The book has been translated into Chinese and Japanese. Reviews described it as "an absorbing, historically precise narrative that reads like a suspense novel," and "an important book about a group of scientists at least one of whom had the future in his bones and the knowledge of what it held".

Of note is a detailed history (in Chapter 6, "The Fourth Column") of the accidental discovery of the p–n junction by Russell Ohl at Bell Labs in early 1940; this is the key discovery that enabled the whole field of solid-state electronics. The book also contains biographical information of Ohl and other Bell Labs scientists and engineers who do not have official biographies, as well as people such as transistor inventors John Bardeen, Walter Brattain, and William Shockley, who do.

Chapters 7 ("Point of Entry") and 8 ("Minority Views") recount the events of December 1947, during which Bardeen and Brattain invented the first, "point-contact" transistor, followed by Shockley's conception of the junction transistor in January 1948. These accounts formed the basis of a PBS-TV documentary, "Transistorized!", whose script was adapted from Crystal Fire and which won the American Association for Advancement of Science Award for scientific television programming.

Crystal Fire is still in print, in a paperback edition, in 2022 — 25 years after its initial, hardcover publication by Norton.
