= Lillian Hoddeson =

American university teacher

Lillian Hartman Hoddeson (born 20 December 1940, in New York City) is an American historian of science, specializing in the history of physics and technology during the 2nd half of the 20th century.

== Education and career ==
Hoddeson received in 1957 a high school diploma from the Bronx High School of Science, in 1961 a bachelor's degree in physics from Barnard College, and in 1966 a Ph.D. in physics from Columbia University with a dissertation on solid-state physics. She was an assistant professor of physics from 1967 to 1970 at Barnard College and from 1971 to 1976 at Rutgers University. In 1974–1975 she was a visiting fellow at Princeton University and took Thomas Kuhn's "History of Quantum Mechanics" graduate course. From 1977 to 1992 she held various academic positions at the University of Illinois Urbana-Champaign, before becoming there an associate professor from 1993 to 2000 and a full professor from 2000 until her retirement. Since 1978 she has held the position of Fermilab's historian.

Hoddeson is the co-author or editor of several books and has published more than 50 articles in referred journals. Her publications include a biography of John Bardeen, history of the development of the transistor, history of Fermilab, technical history of the beginning of Los Alamos National Laboratory, and history of the development of the atomic bomb in the Manhattan Project. She co-authored three important books on the history of particle physics and a 2015 book on the Superconducting Super Collider.

In 2012 she received the Abraham Pais Prize for History of Physics from the American Physical Society. She was a Guggenheim Fellow for the academic year 2000–2001 and is a Fellow of the American Physical Society.

She was married to physicist Gordon Baym from 1981 to 1992.

== Selected publications ==
- as editor with Jürgen Teichmann, Spencer Weart, Ernest Braun: Out of the Crystal Maze: Chapters from the history of solid-state physics, Oxford University Press 1992 (contribution by Hoddeson, Michael Eckert, Gordon Baym The development of quantum mechanical electron theory of metals 1926–1933 and contribution from Hoddeson, Helmut Schubert, Steve J. Heims, Baym Collective Phenomena)
- with Michael Riordan: Crystal Fire: The Birth of the Information Age, Norton 1997 (history of the transistor and integrated circuit, and biographical information on many of those involved)
- with Vicki Daitch: True Genius: The life and science of John Bardeen, National Academy of Science Press 2002
- with Adrienne Kolb, Catherine Westfall: Fermilab: physics, the frontier and the rise of megascience, University of Chicago Press 2008
- as editor with Laurie Brown: The birth of particle physics, Cambridge University Press 1983
- as editor with Laurie Brown, Max Dresden, Michael Riordan The rise of the Standard Model: Particle physics in the 1960s and 1970s, Cambridge University Press 1997 (with an introduction by Brown, Riordan and Hoddeson on The rise of the standard model 1964–1979, pp. 3–35)
- with Laurie Brown, Max Dresden: Pions to quarks: Particle physics in the 1950s, Cambridge University Press 1989
- with Paul W. Henriksen, Roger A. Meade, Catherine Westfall: Critical Assembly: A technical history of Los Alamos during the Oppenheimer years 1943–1945, Cambridge University Press 1993 (with contributions by Gordon Baym and others)
- as editor: No boundaries: University of Illinois vignettes, University of Illinois Press 2004 (with a preface by Richard Herman)
- with Michael Riordan, Adrienne W. Kolb: Tunnel visions: the rise and fall of the superconducting super collider, University of Chicago Press 2015
