= BTZ black hole =

Black hole solution in 2+1 dimensional topological gravity

The Bañados–Teitelboim–Zanelli (BTZ) black hole, named after Máximo Bañados, Claudio Teitelboim, and Jorge Zanelli, is a black hole solution for (2+1)-dimensional topological gravity with a negative cosmological constant.

== History ==
In 1992, Bañados, Teitelboim, and Zanelli discovered the BTZ black hole solution (Bañados, Teitelboim & Zanelli 1992). This came as a surprise, because when the cosmological constant is zero, a vacuum solution of (2+1)-dimensional gravity is necessarily flat (the Weyl tensor vanishes in three dimensions, while the Ricci tensor vanishes due to the Einstein field equations, so the full Riemann tensor vanishes), and it can be shown that no black hole solutions with event horizons exist. But thanks to the negative cosmological constant in the BTZ black hole, it is able to have remarkably similar properties to the 3+1 dimensional Schwarzschild and Kerr black hole solutions, which model real-world black holes.

== Properties ==
The similarities to the ordinary black holes in 3+1 dimensions:

- It admits a no hair theorem, fully characterizing the solution by its ADM-mass, angular momentum and charge.
- It has the same thermodynamical properties as traditional black hole solutions such as Schwarzschild or Kerr black holes, e.g. its entropy is captured by a law directly analogous to the Bekenstein bound in (3+1)-dimensions, essentially with the surface area replaced by the BTZ black hole's circumference.
- Like the Kerr black hole, a rotating BTZ black hole contains an inner and an outer horizon, analogous to an ergosphere.

Since (2+1)-dimensional gravity has no Newtonian limit, one might fear that the BTZ black hole is not the final state of a gravitational collapse. It was however shown, that this black hole could arise from collapsing matter and we can calculate the energy-moment tensor of BTZ as same as (3+1) black holes. (Carlip 1995, section 3 Black Holes and Gravitational Collapse)

The BTZ solution is often discussed in the realm on (2+1)-dimensional quantum gravity.

== Case without charge ==
The metric in the absence of charge is

$$ds^2 =  -\frac{(r^2 - r_+^2)(r^2 - r_-^2)}{l^2 r^2}dt^2 + \frac{l^2 r^2 dr^2}{(r^2 - r_+^2)(r^2 - r_-^2)} + r^2 \left(d\phi - \frac{r_+ r_-}{l r^2} dt \right)^2$$

where $r_+,~r_-$ are the black hole radii and $l$ is the radius of AdS_{3} space. The mass and angular momentum of the black hole is

$$M = \frac{r_+^2 + r_-^2}{l^2},~~~~~J = \frac{2r_+ r_-}{l}$$

BTZ black holes without any electric charge are locally isometric to anti-de Sitter space. More precisely, it corresponds to an orbifold of the universal covering space of AdS_{3.}

A rotating BTZ black hole admits closed timelike curves.

== See also ==
- Cosmic string
- MTZ black hole
- AdS black hole
