= Minsk Tractor Works =

Belarusian agricultural machinery manufacturer

Coordinates: 53°53′26″N 27°37′04″E

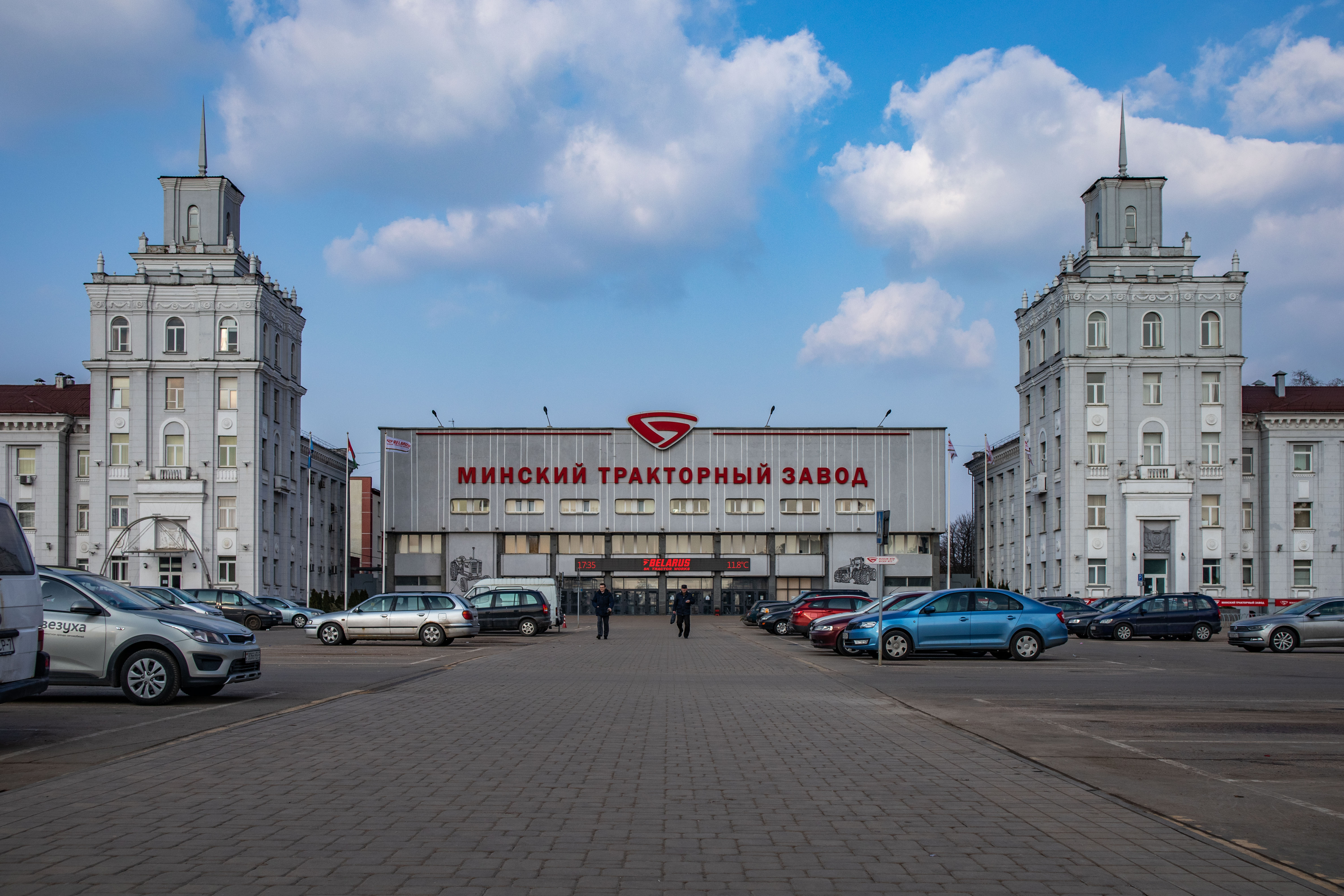
- Native name: Мінскі трактарны завод
- Type: State owned enterprise
- Industry: Agricultural machinery
- Founded: 1946
- Headquarters: Minsk, Belarus
- Products: Tractors
- Revenue: ▲BYN 1.773 billion €536.940 million (2024)
- Net income: ▲BYN 48.196 million €14.596 million (2021)
- Total assets: ▲BYN 2.541 billion €769.759 million (2021)
- Number of employees: 15,377 (2021)
- Website: www.belarus-tractor.com/en/

Minsk Tractor Works (Belarusian: Мінскі трактарны завод, romanized: Minski traktarny zavod; Russian: Минский тракторный завод, romanized: Minskiy traktorniy zavod; MTZ) is a Belarusian agricultural machinery manufacturer with headquarters in Minsk, Belarus. Minsk Tractor Works is one of the main tractor factories in the country. It is a part of the Minsk Tractor Works Industrial Association. In addition to the main plant in Minsk, the association includes a number of plants that produce parts and attachable tools for tractors and other vehicles produced by MTZ.

== History ==
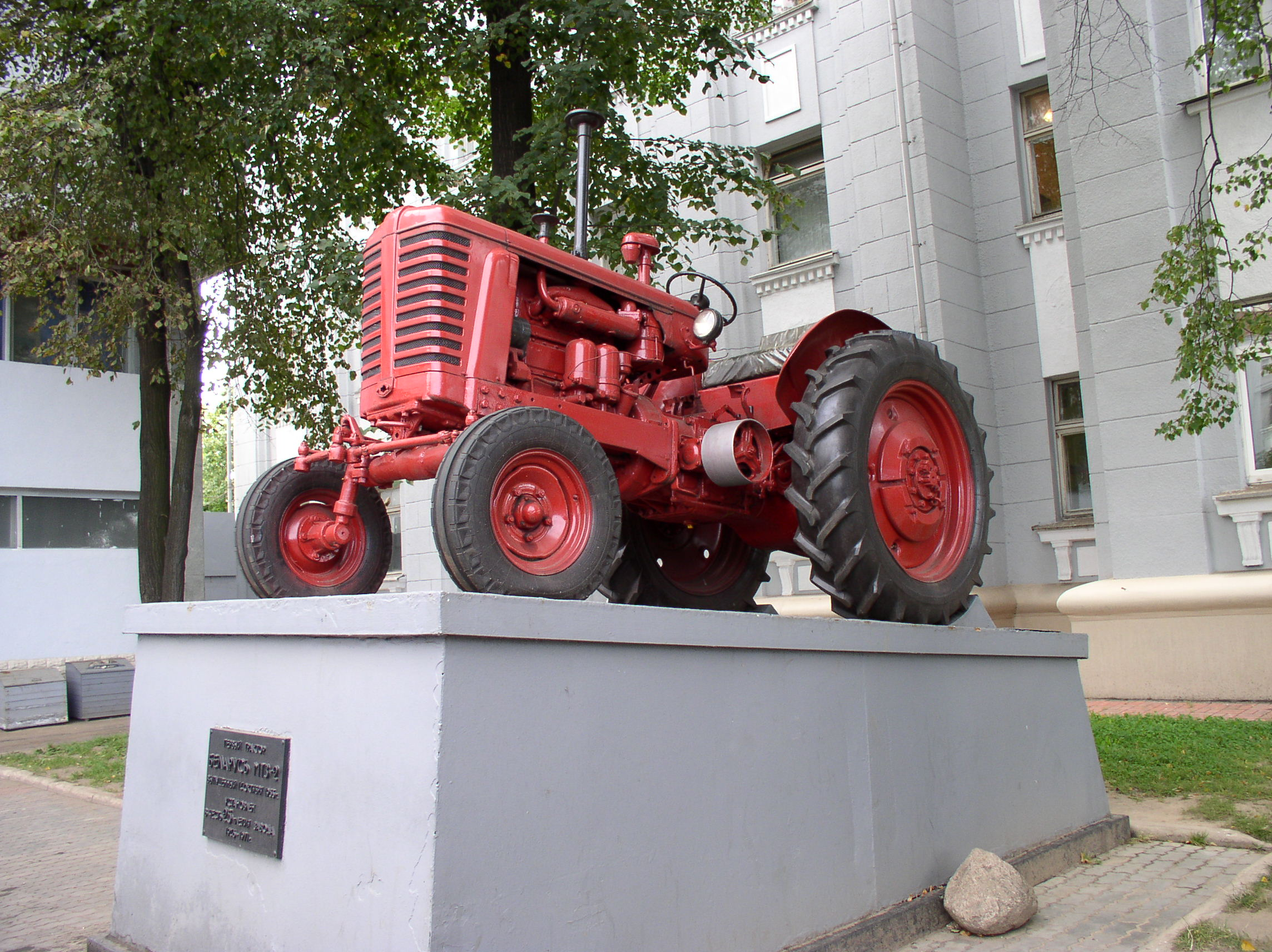
MTZ-2 (1954-1958) tractor near Minsk Tractor Works. Minsk, Belarus.

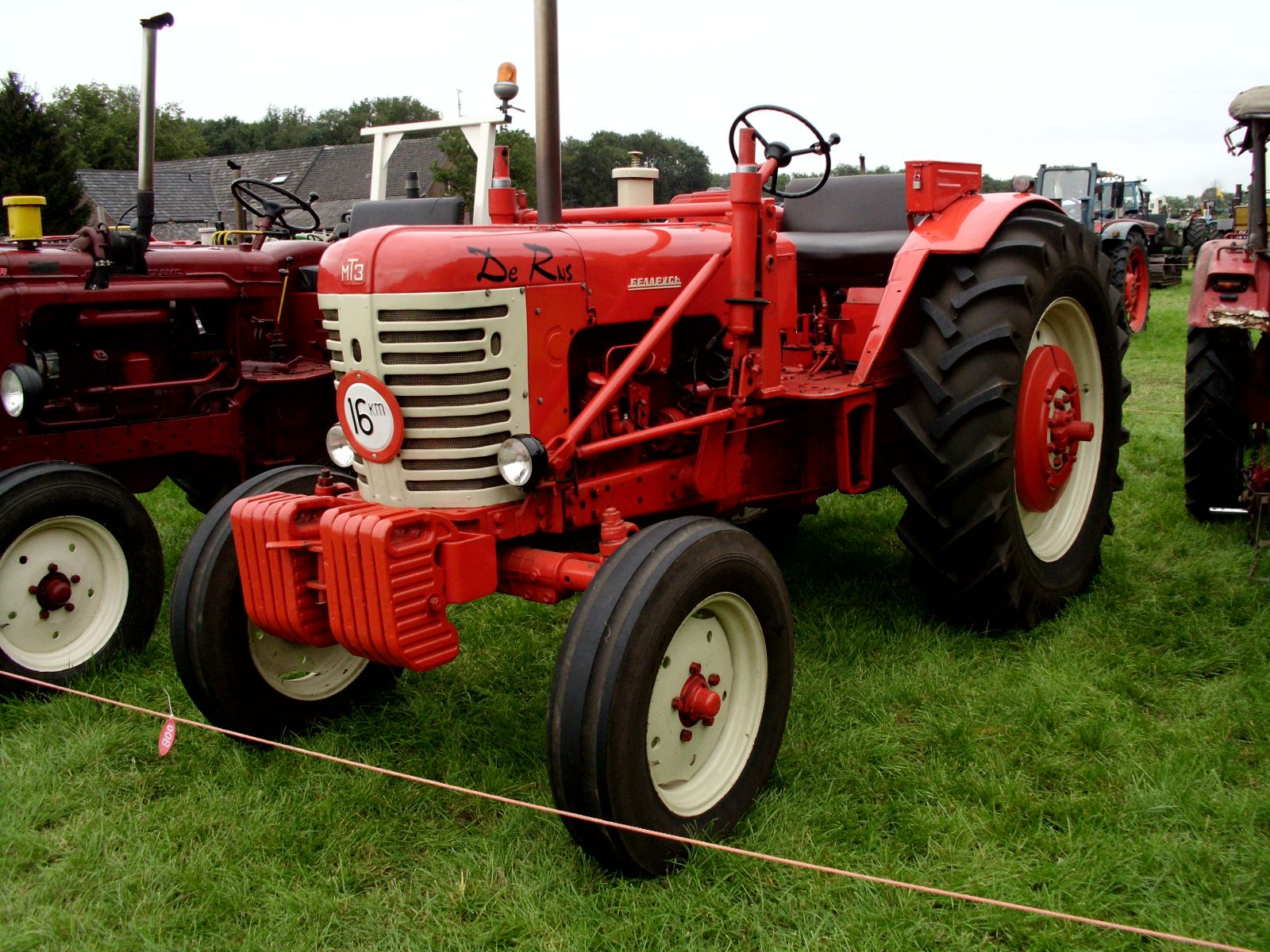
MTZ-5 (1957-1972)

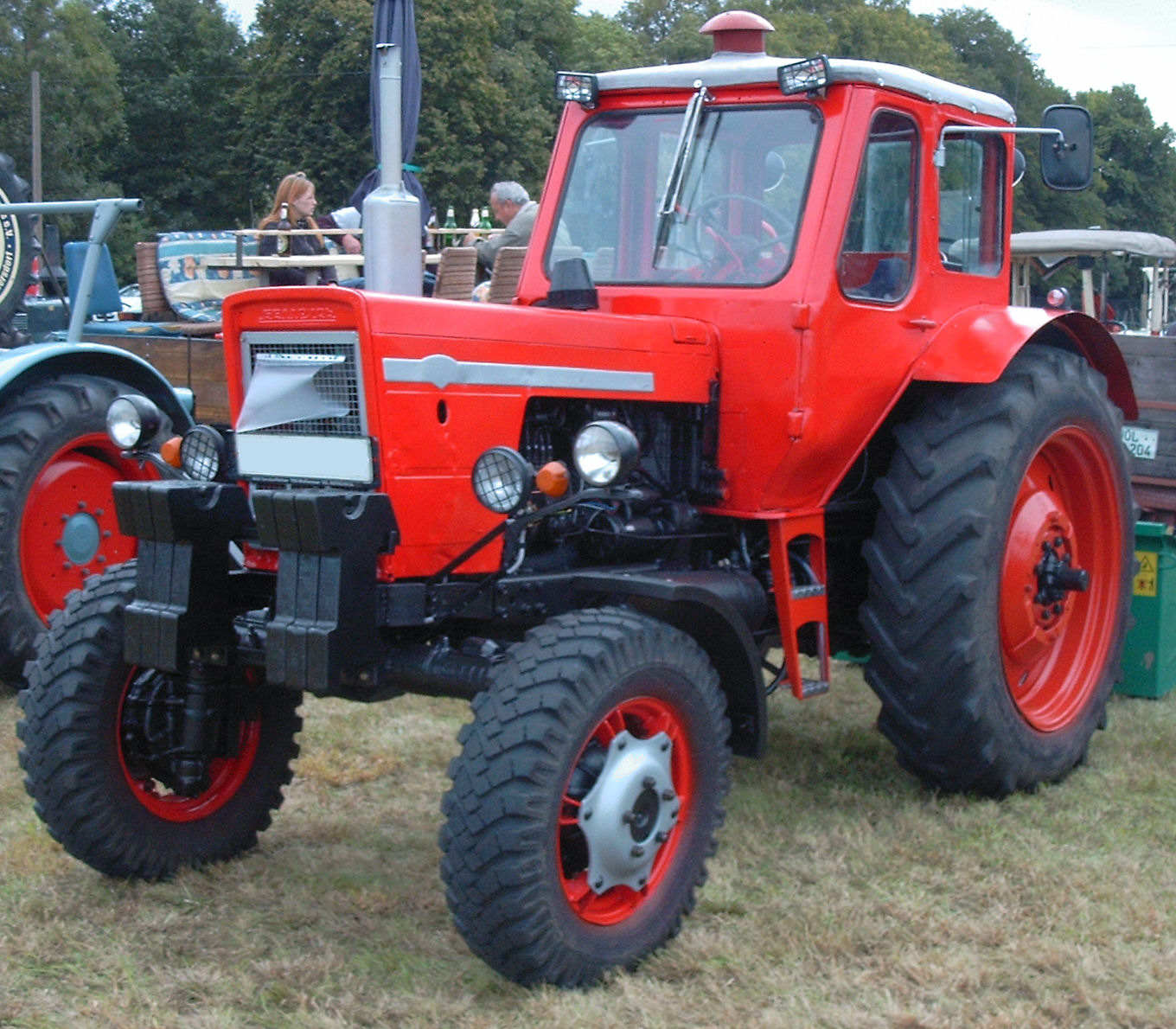
MTZ-52 (1962-1985)

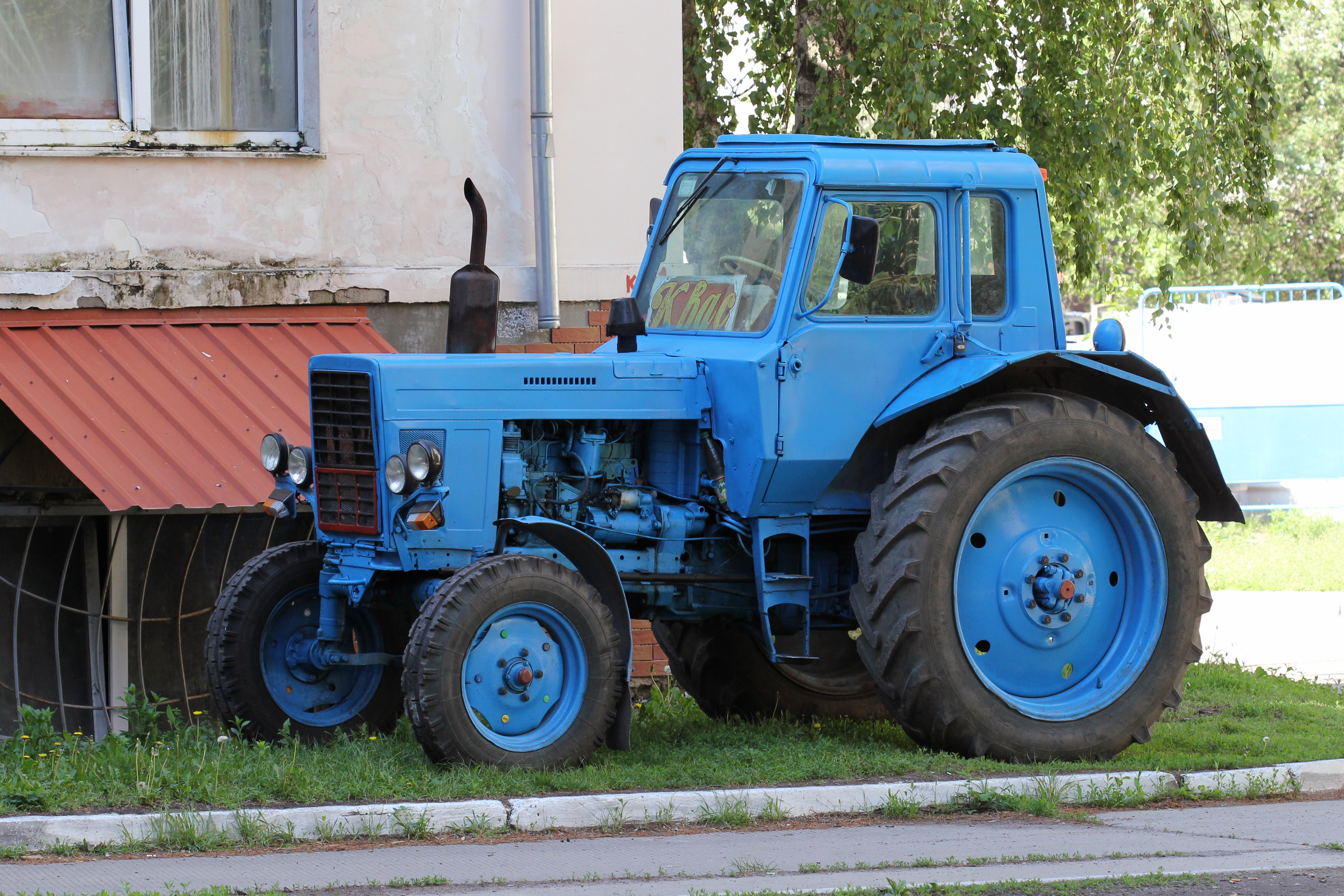
MTZ-80 (since 1974)

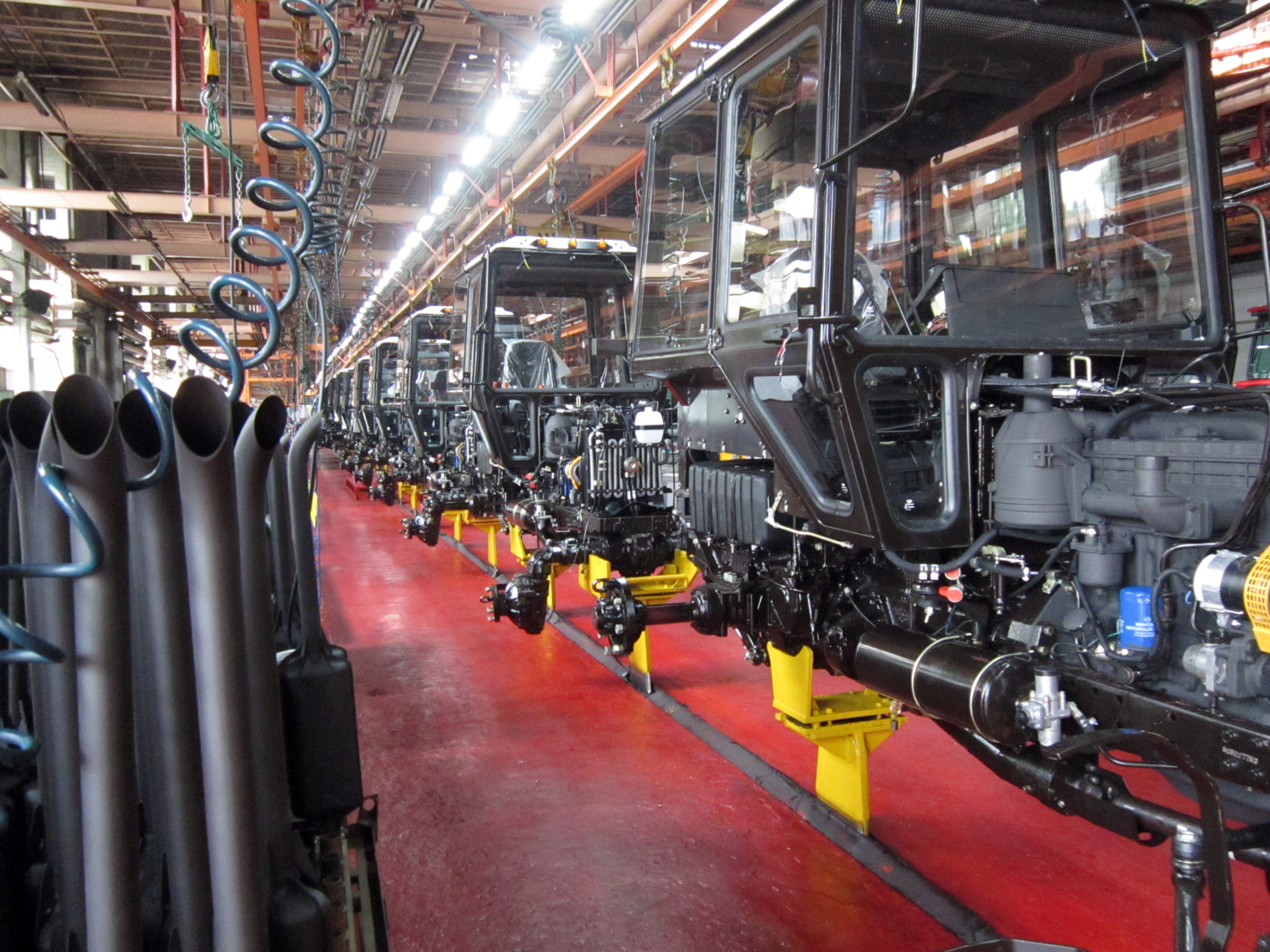
Main assembly line

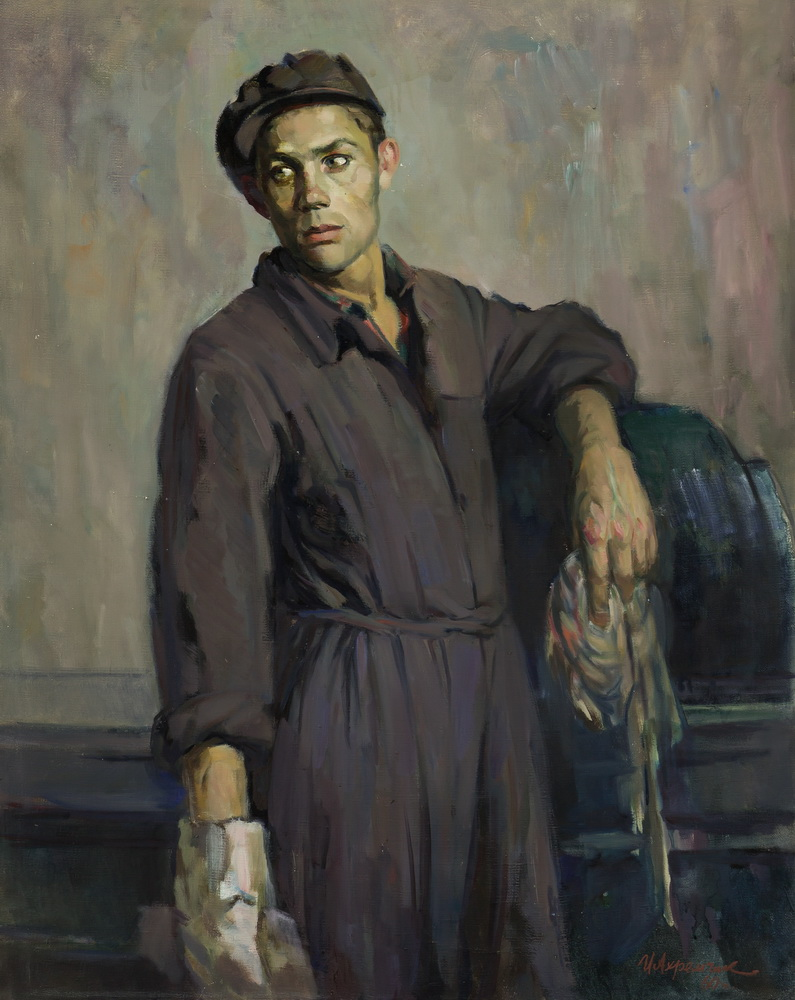
1960 socialist realist painting by Ivan Akhremchik: "Komsomol member Kostya, worker at Minsk Tractor Works."

The plant was established on 29 May 1946. The first manufactured tractor was caterpillar tractor KD-35 "Kirovets". The production of MTZ-model tractors, the MTZ-1 and MTZ-2 models, started on October 14, 1953. (Prototypes were manufactured in 1949.)

As of 2005, it had nearly 20,000 workers. The plant produces over 62 models of vehicles. Its main civil production has been four-wheeled tractors of model "MTZ", known as Belarus. By 1995 the plant had manufactured 3,000,000 tractors. In 1999, it produced 58% of all tractors manufactured in the CIS. In 2017, its share in the production of wheel tractors in CIS countries was 87%.

MTZ tractors were exported to Western Europe, too.

In 2013, the plant tractors were certified in the US by the Environment Protection Agency (EPA) and in Canada by Environment Canada and received full approval for their import and distribution in both countries. Since 2010, distribution of Belarus tractors in the US and Canada is carried on through a local distributor, MTZ Equipment Ltd.

In 2015, MTZ produced 2,424 tractors, an increase of 45% compared to the previous year (1,648 tractors).

In 2017, 92.1% tractors of 31,011 produced were exported. Eight countries imported more than 500 "Belarus" tractors: Russia (11,135), Pakistan (4,845), Ukraine (4,028), Kazakhstan (2,106), Azerbaijan (1,637), Hungary (871), Romania (812), Lithuania (736).

In 2020, after the Presidential elections, the workers of MTZ went on a strike against Alexander Lukashenko.

In 2022, Canada and Ukraine imposed sanctions on MTZ.

== Products ==
=== Tractors ===
Belarus-80.1; Belarus-82.1; Belarus-90; Belarus-92; Belarus-320; Belarus-310; Belarus-321; Belarus-422; Belarus-510; Belarus, 512; Belarus-520; Belarus-522; Belarus-572; Belarus-622; Belarus-820; Belarus-826; Belarus-892; Belarus-920; Belarus-922.3; Belarus-923.3; Belarus-1021; Belarus-Belarus-1025.2 1220.3; Belarus-1221.2; Belarus-1523; Belarus-2022.3; Belarus-3022DTS.1; Belarus-3522.; Belarus-5022

=== Special tractors ===
Belarus-80X; Belarus-100X; Belarus-920R; Belarus-921.3; BELARUS-921.4-10 / 91.

=== Caterpillar tractors ===
From November 1950 to August 1951 the plant manufactured the caterpillar tractor KD-35 "Kirovets".

Also for some time the plant manufactured skidders.

== Associated plants ==
- MTZ plant
- Сморгоньский агрегатный завод, Smarhon mechanical unit plant
- Бобруйский завод тракторных деталей и агрегатов, Babruysk tractor part and mechanical unit plant
- Витебский завод тракторных запчастей, Vitsebsk tractor part plant
- Минский завод специнструмента и технологической оснастки, Minsk instrument and auxiliaries plant
- Минский завод шестерён, Minsk gear plant
- Лепельский электромеханический завод, Lepel electromechanical plant
- Смолевичский завод шестерён, Smalyavichy gear plant
- Гомельский завод «Гидропривод», Gomel hydraulic drive plant
- Завод гидроаппаратуры в г. Хойники, Khoyniki hydraulic drive plant
- Наровлянский завод гидроаппаратуры, Narowlya hydraulic drive plant
- Мозырский машиностроительный завод, Mazyr machine-building plant
- Saint Petersburg

Joint assembly production of MTZ tractors began in 2013 in Cambodia, at MTZ's first assembly plant in the ASEAN region. Tractors are now exported to all ASEAN countries.

== Sport, media, and culture ==
Until 2010 Minsk Tractor Works was a sponsor of a Belarusian Premier League football team MTZ-RIPO Minsk. Games were played at Traktor stadium, which is located near the plant.

The Palace of Culture of the plant hosts the ballroom Dance Club Mara.

== Gallery ==
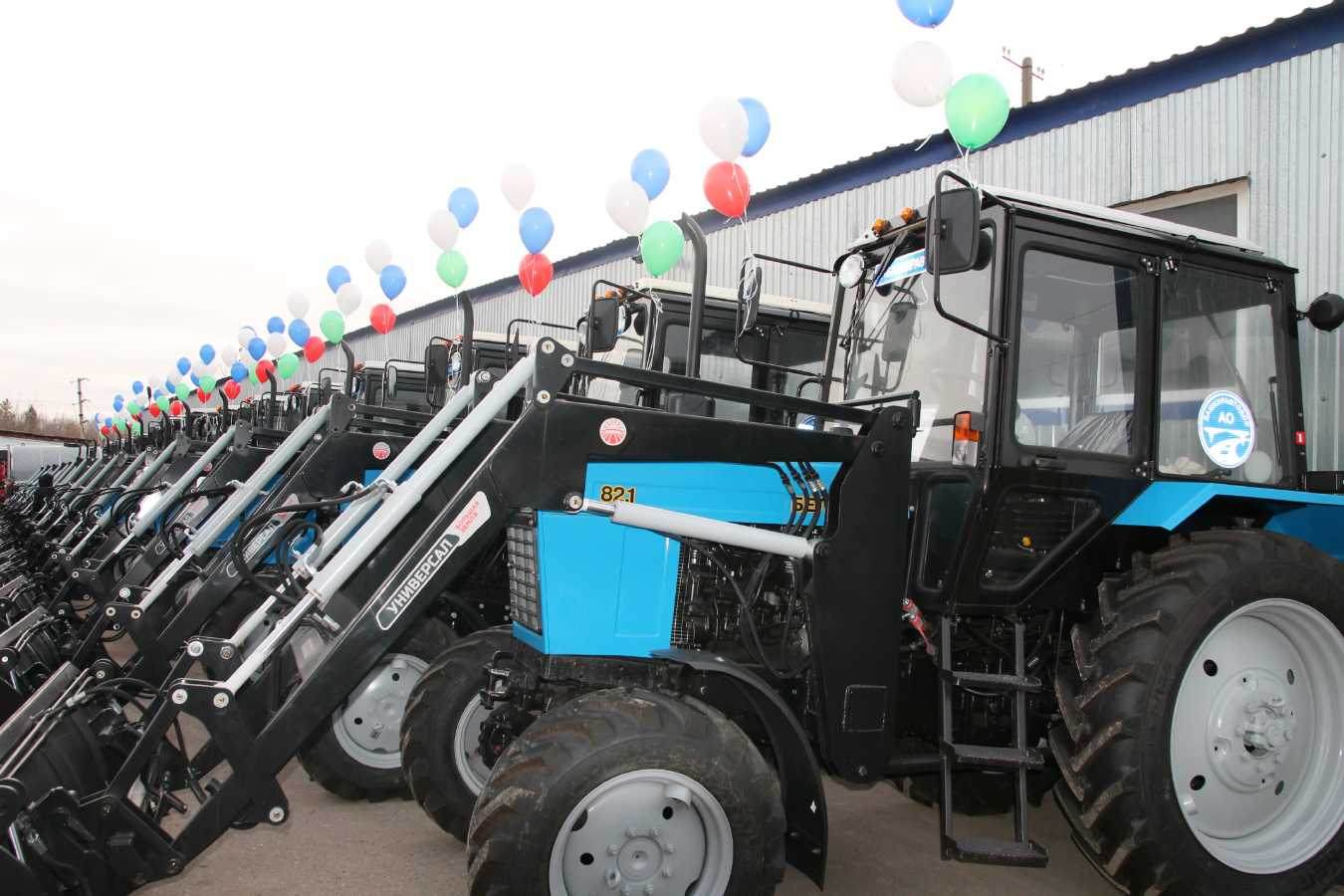
MTZ-82.1 tractor with front loader

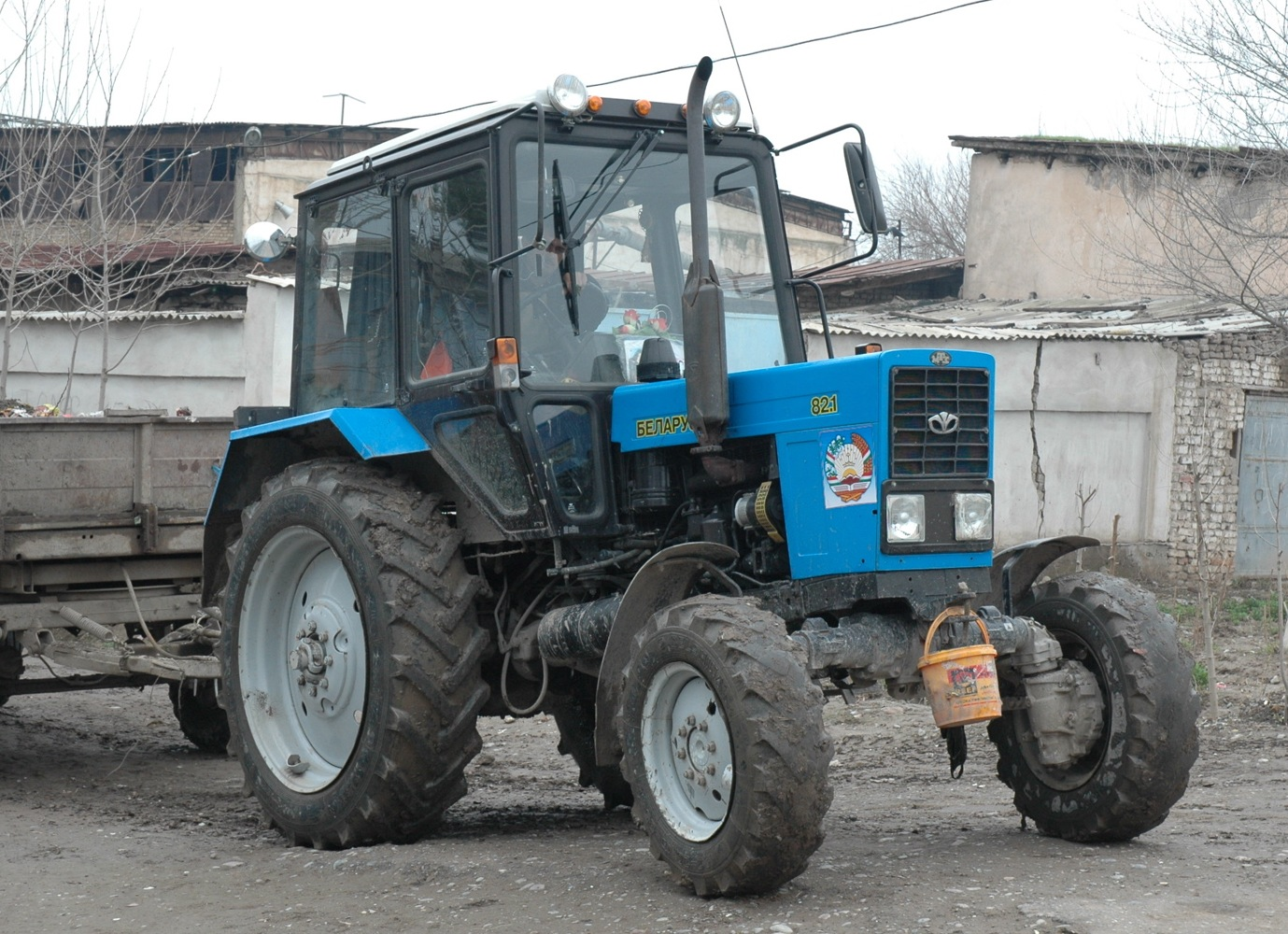
MTZ-82

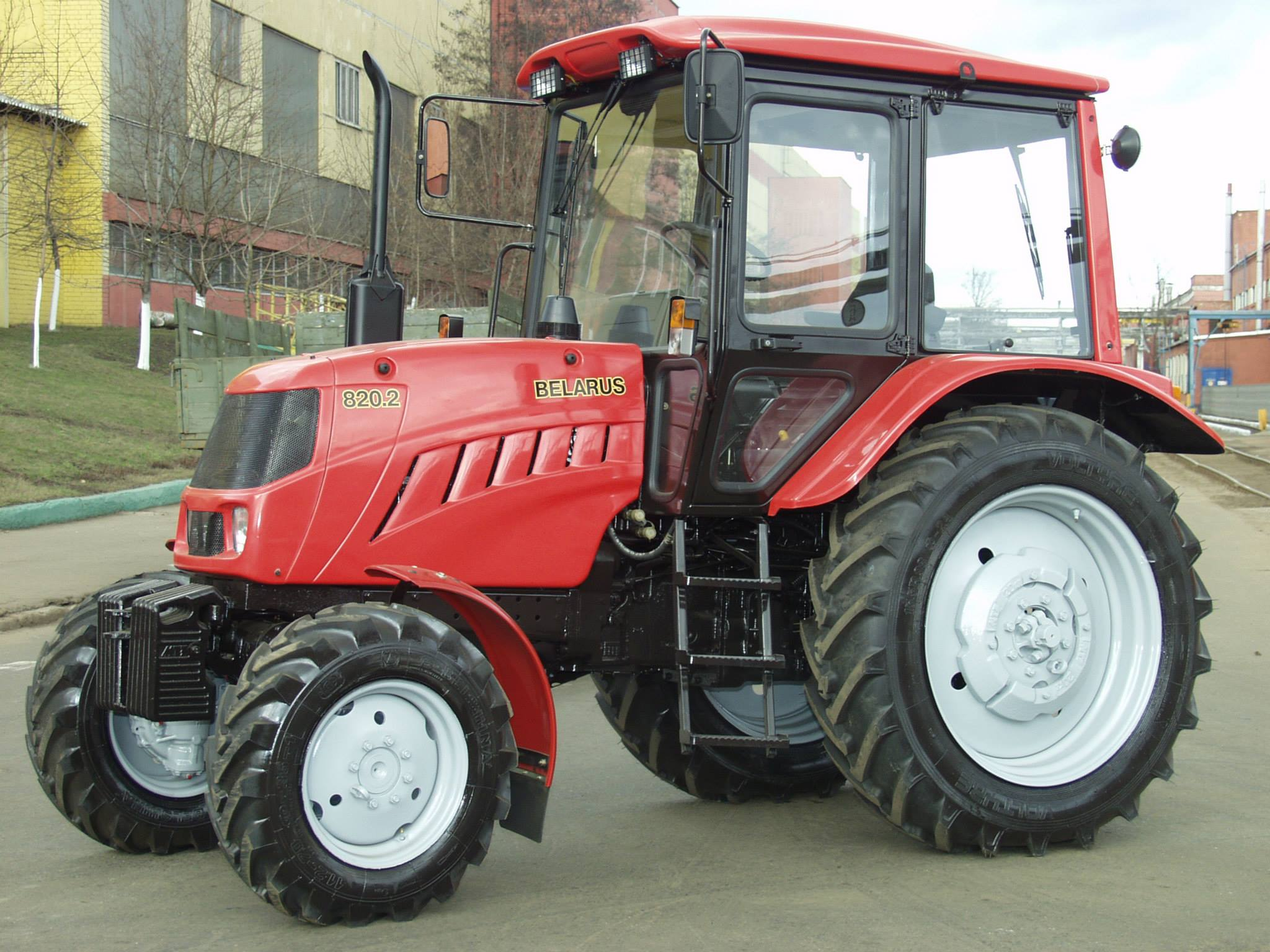
MTZ-820

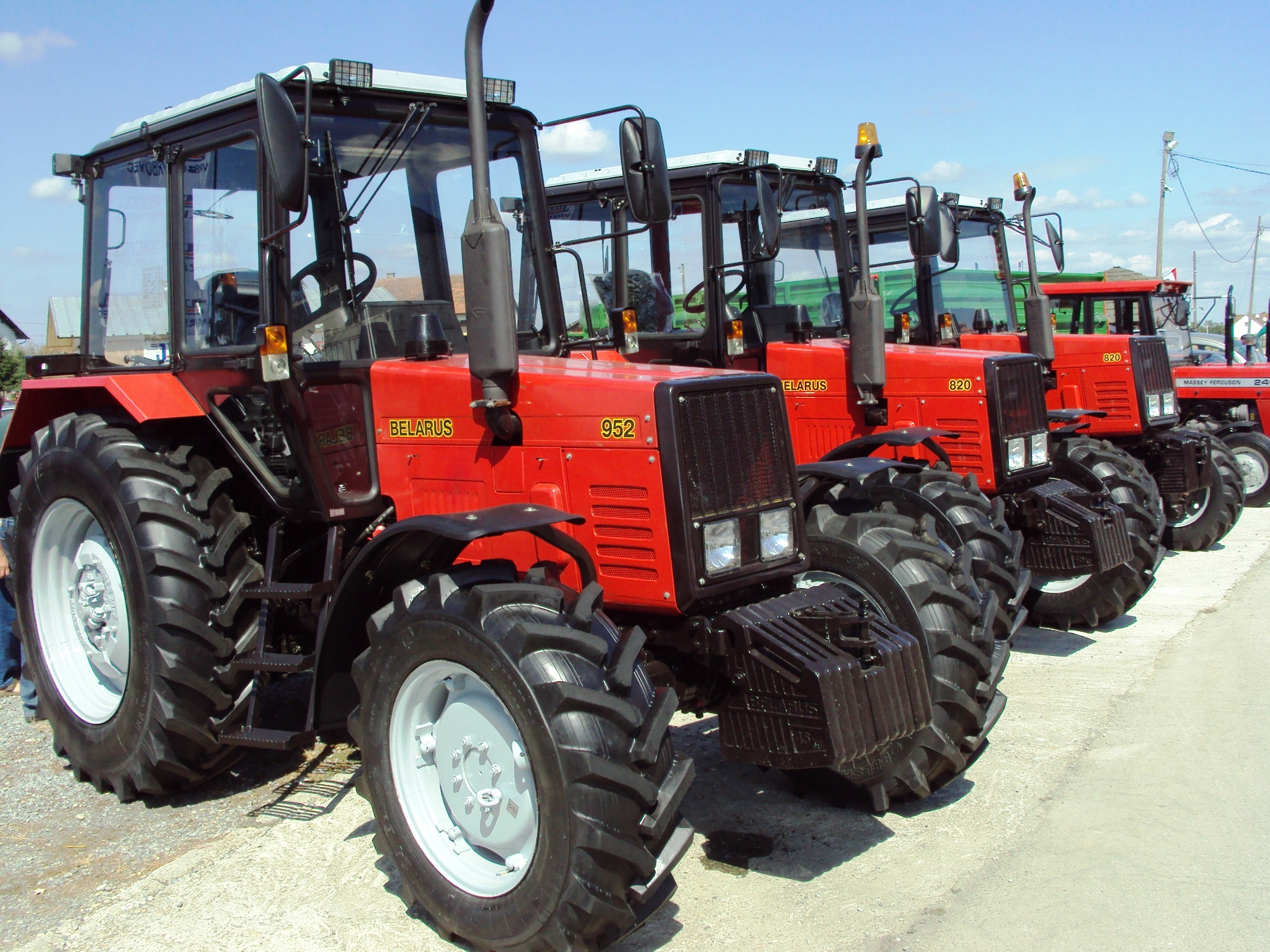
MTZ-952

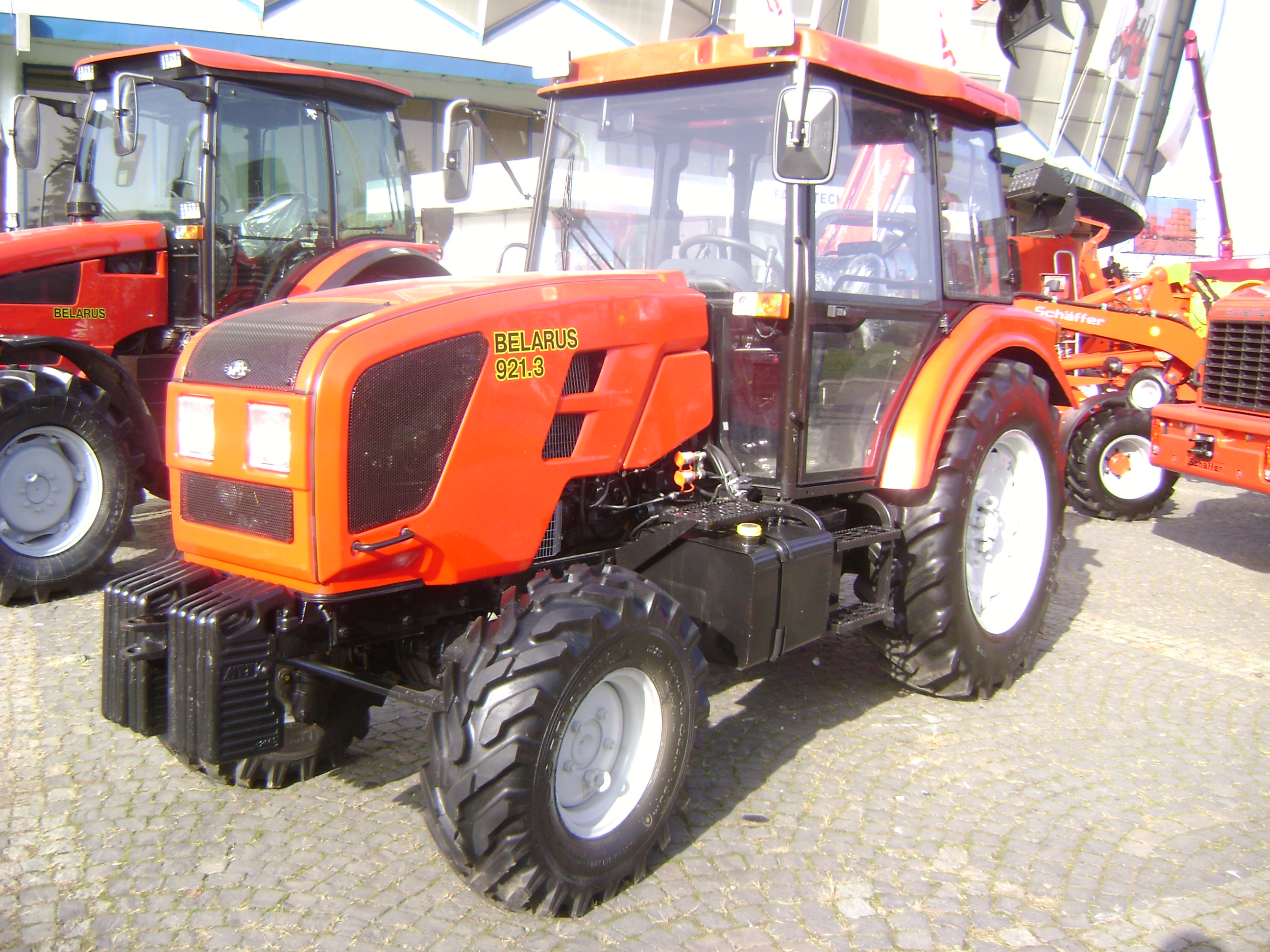
MTZ-921

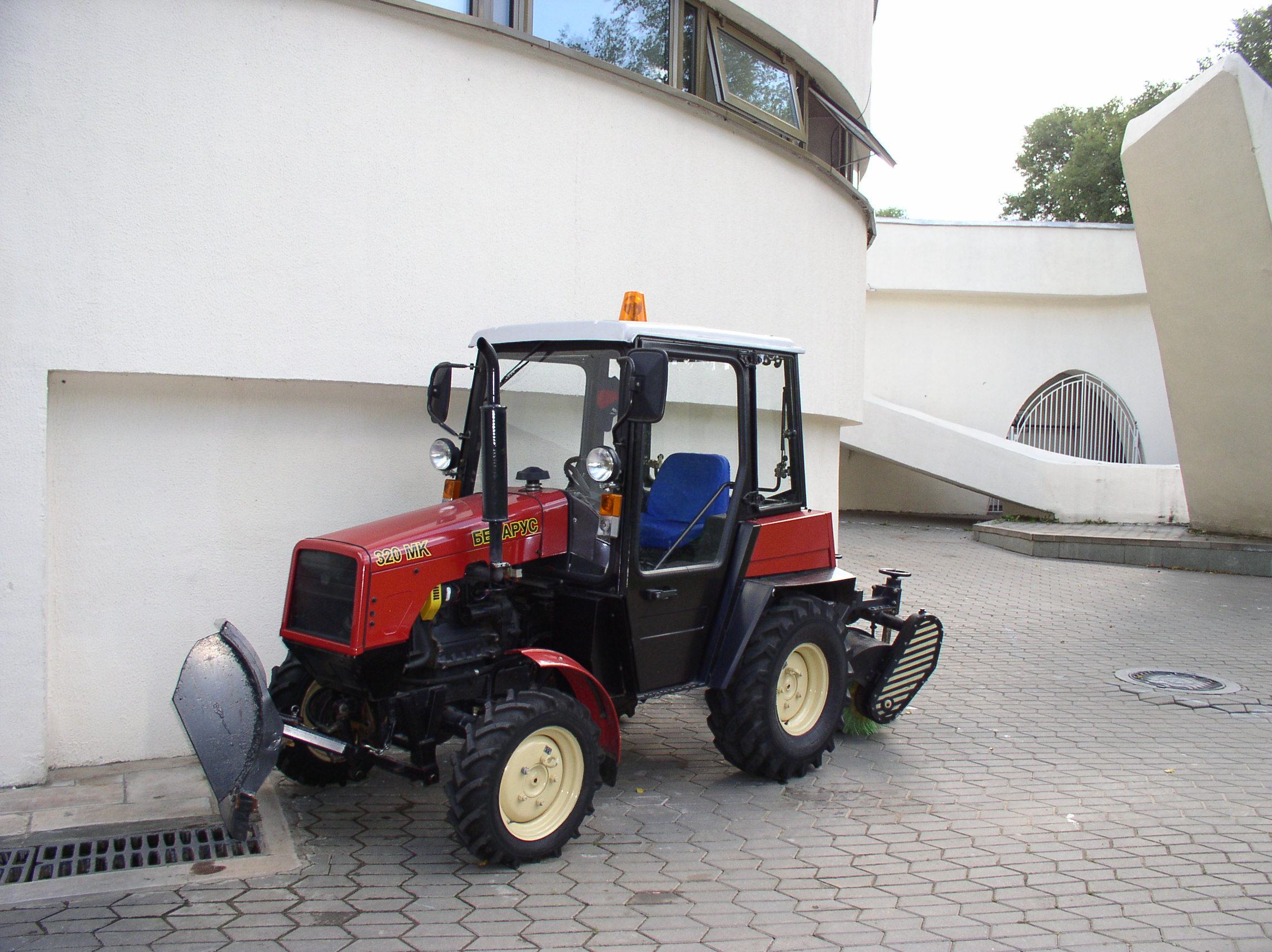
MTZ-320

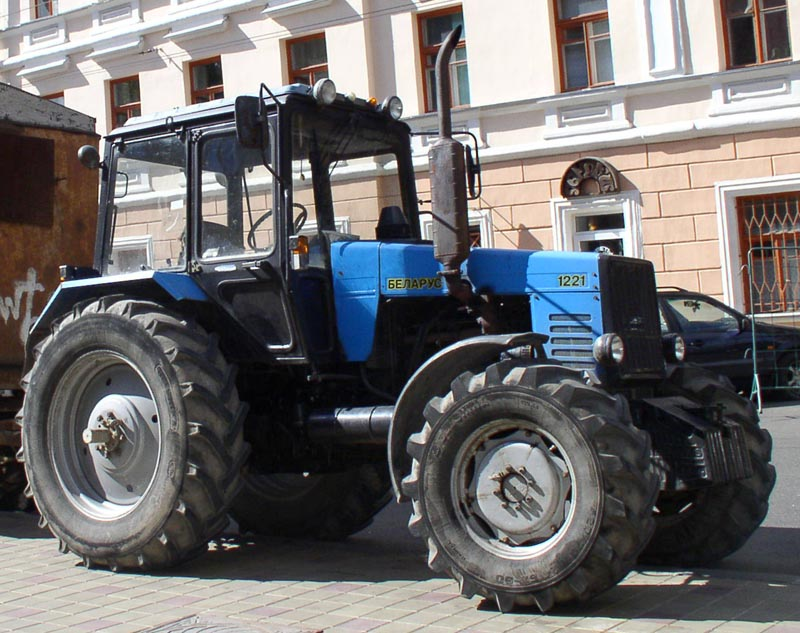
MTZ-1221

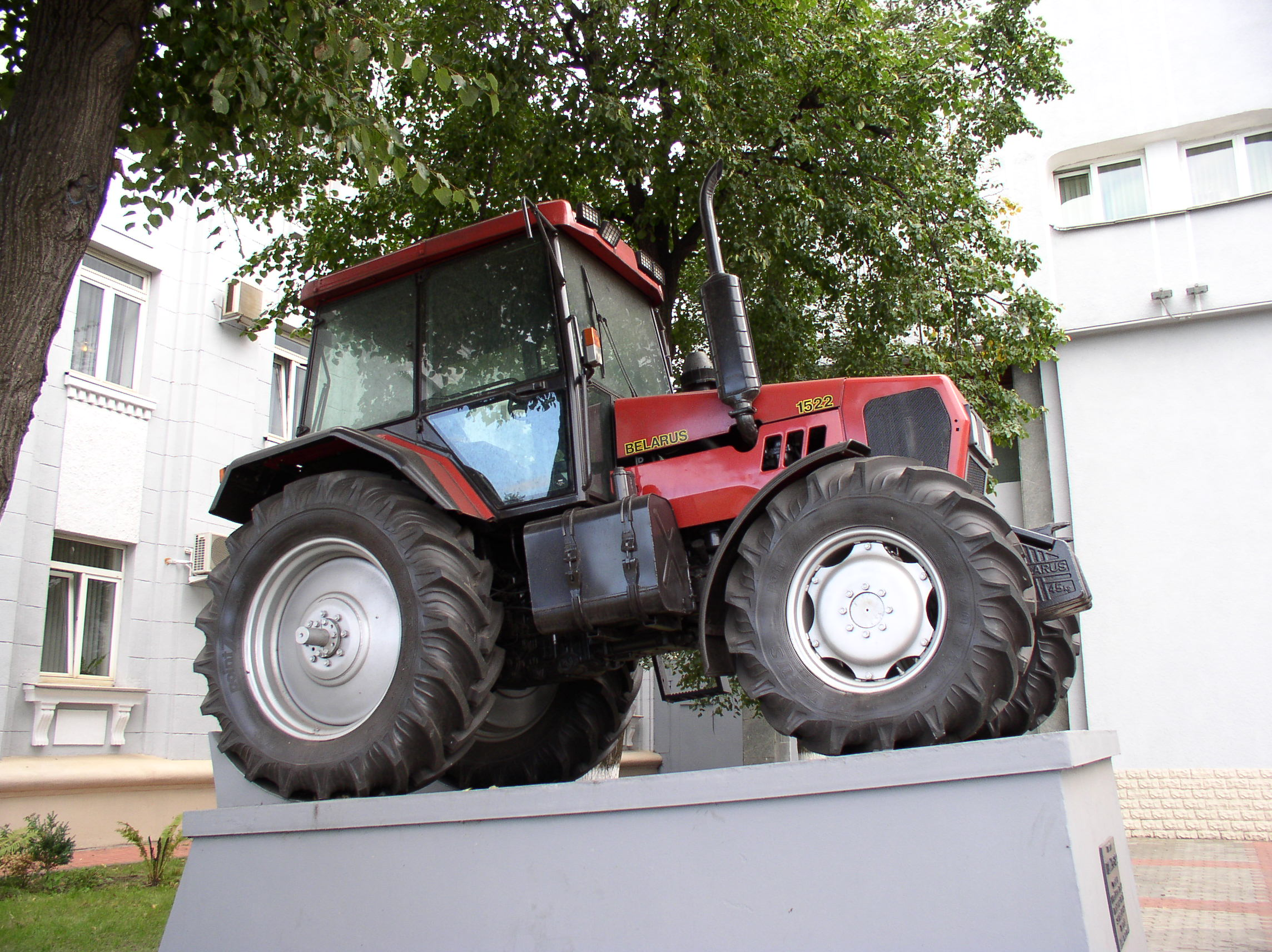
MTZ-1522

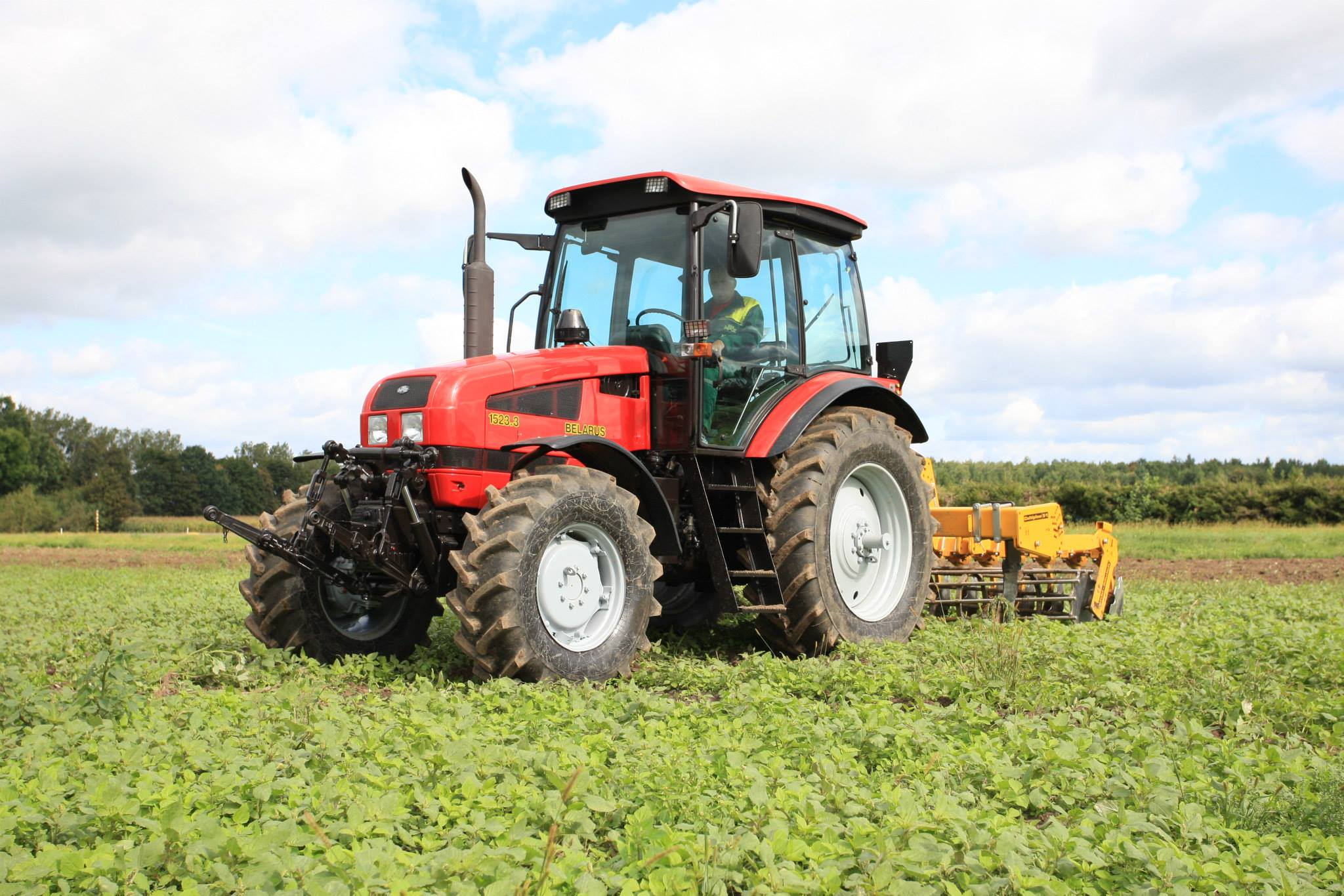
MTZ-1523

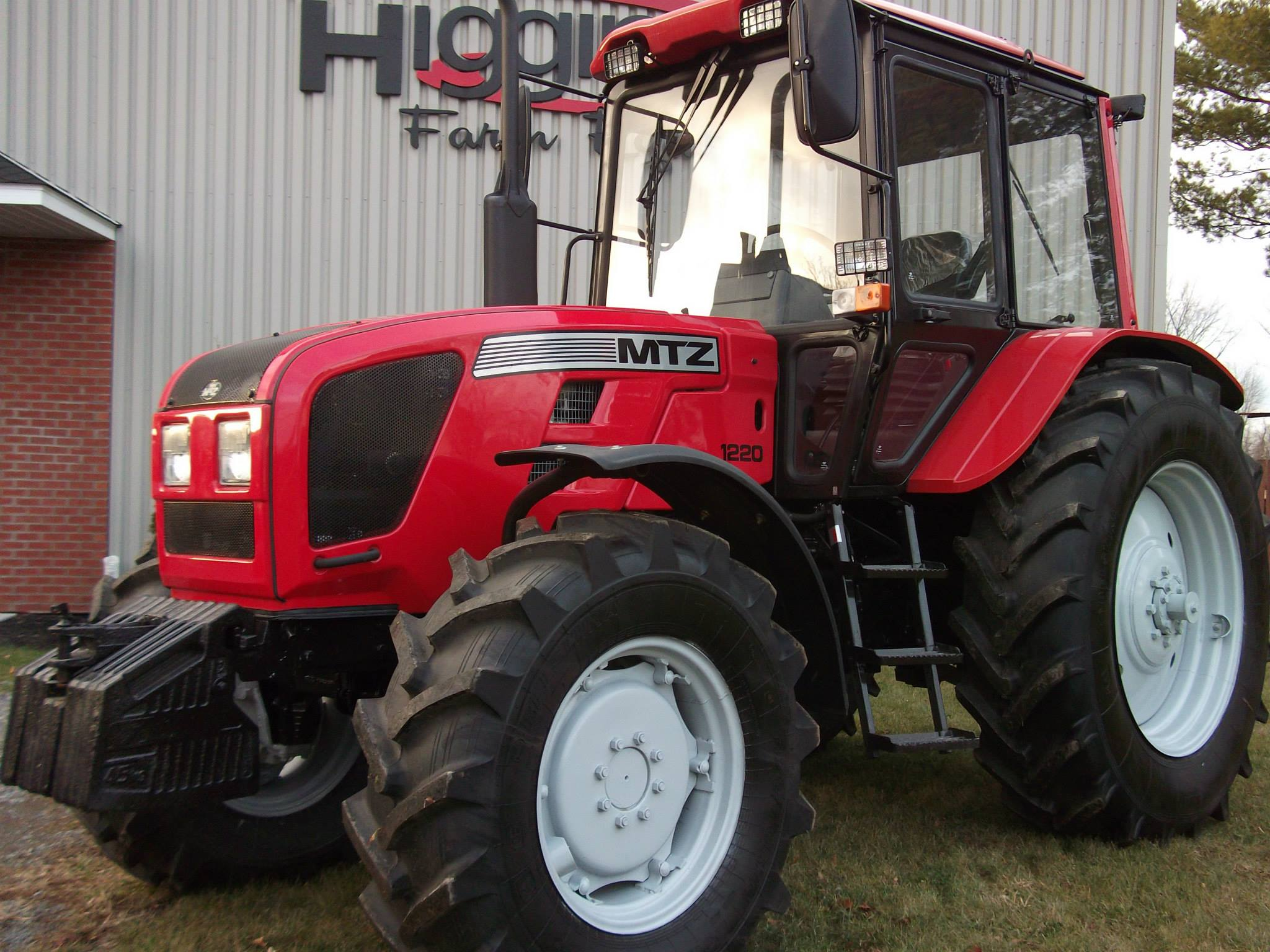
MTZ-1220

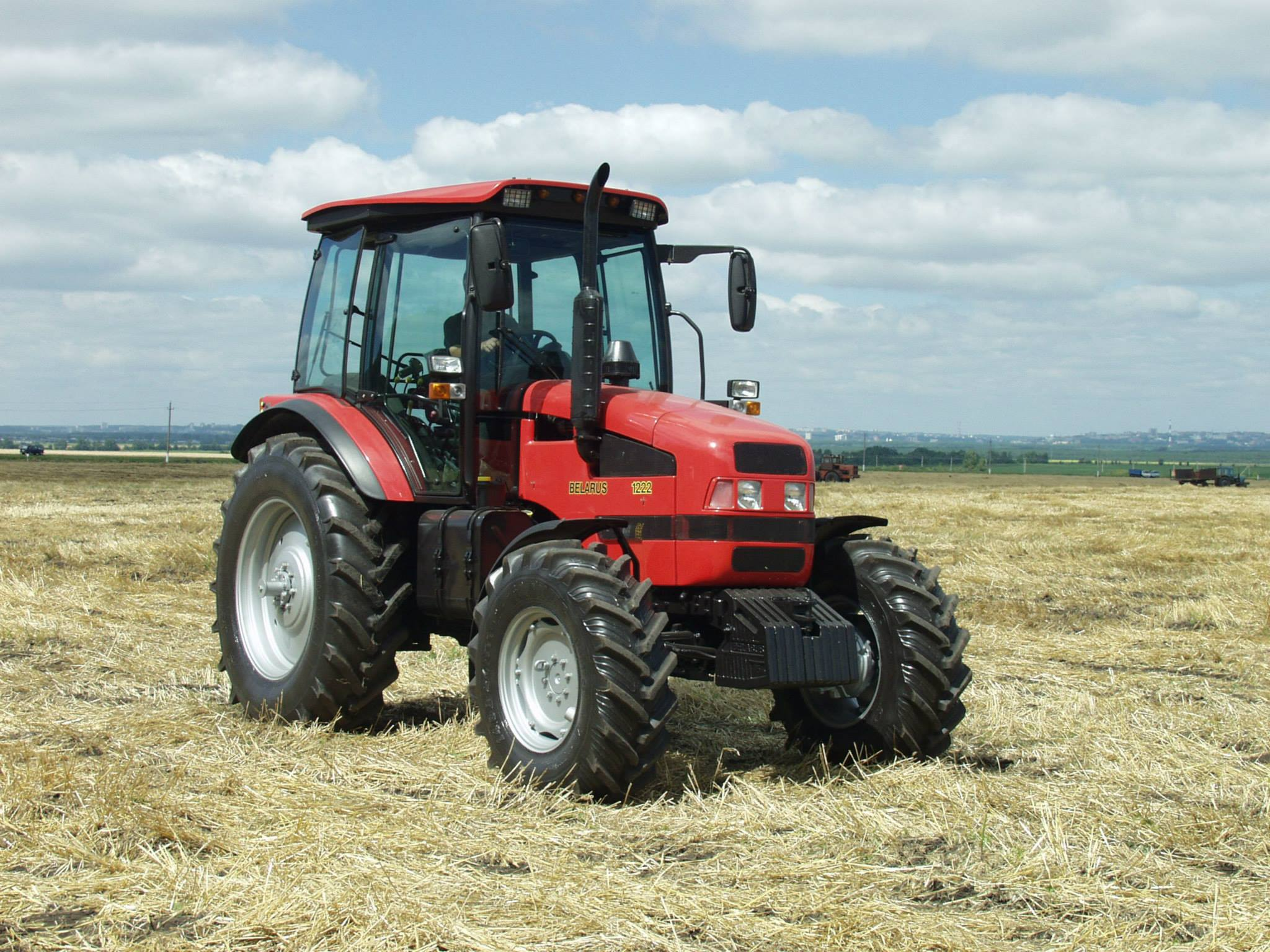
MTZ-1222

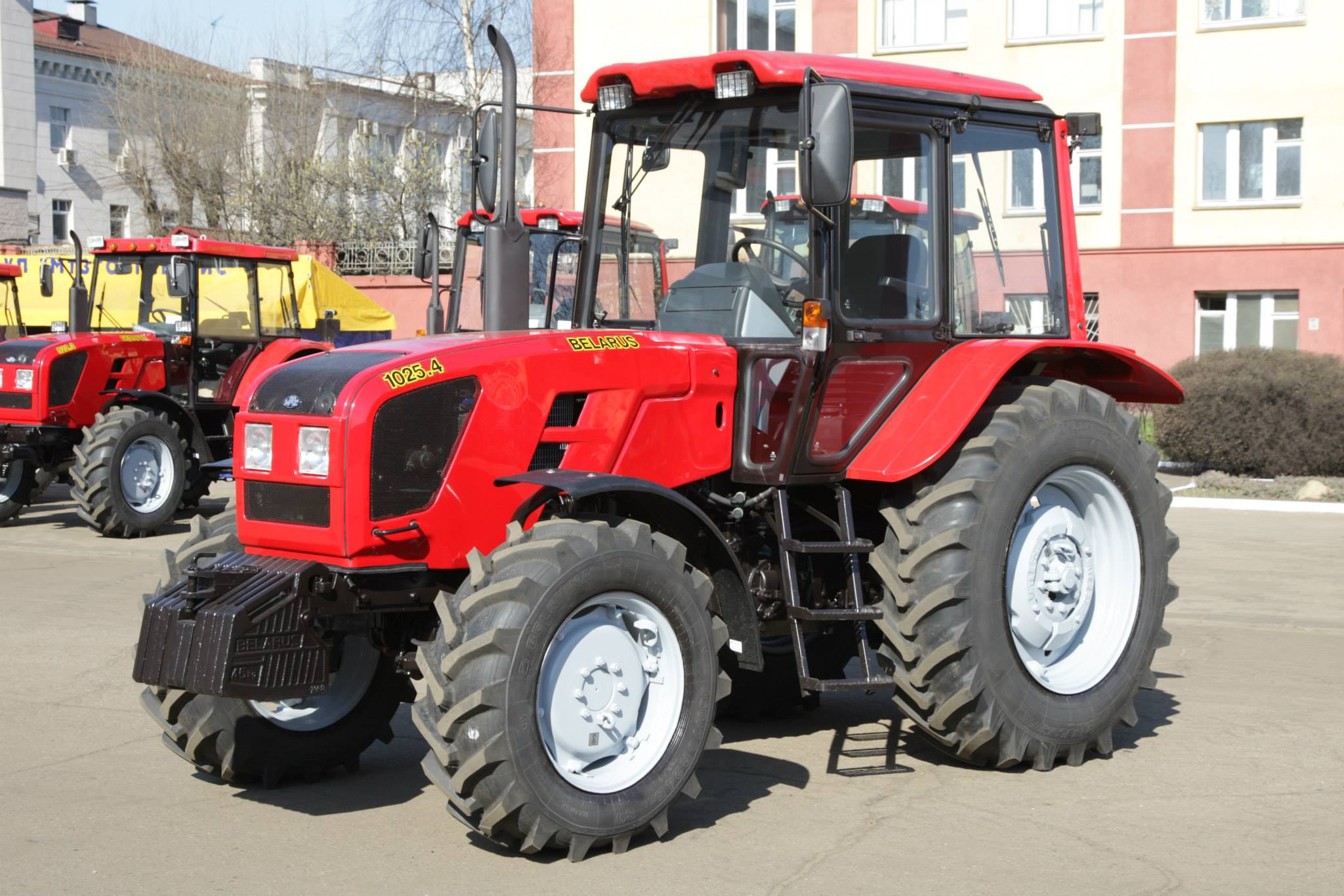
MTZ-1025

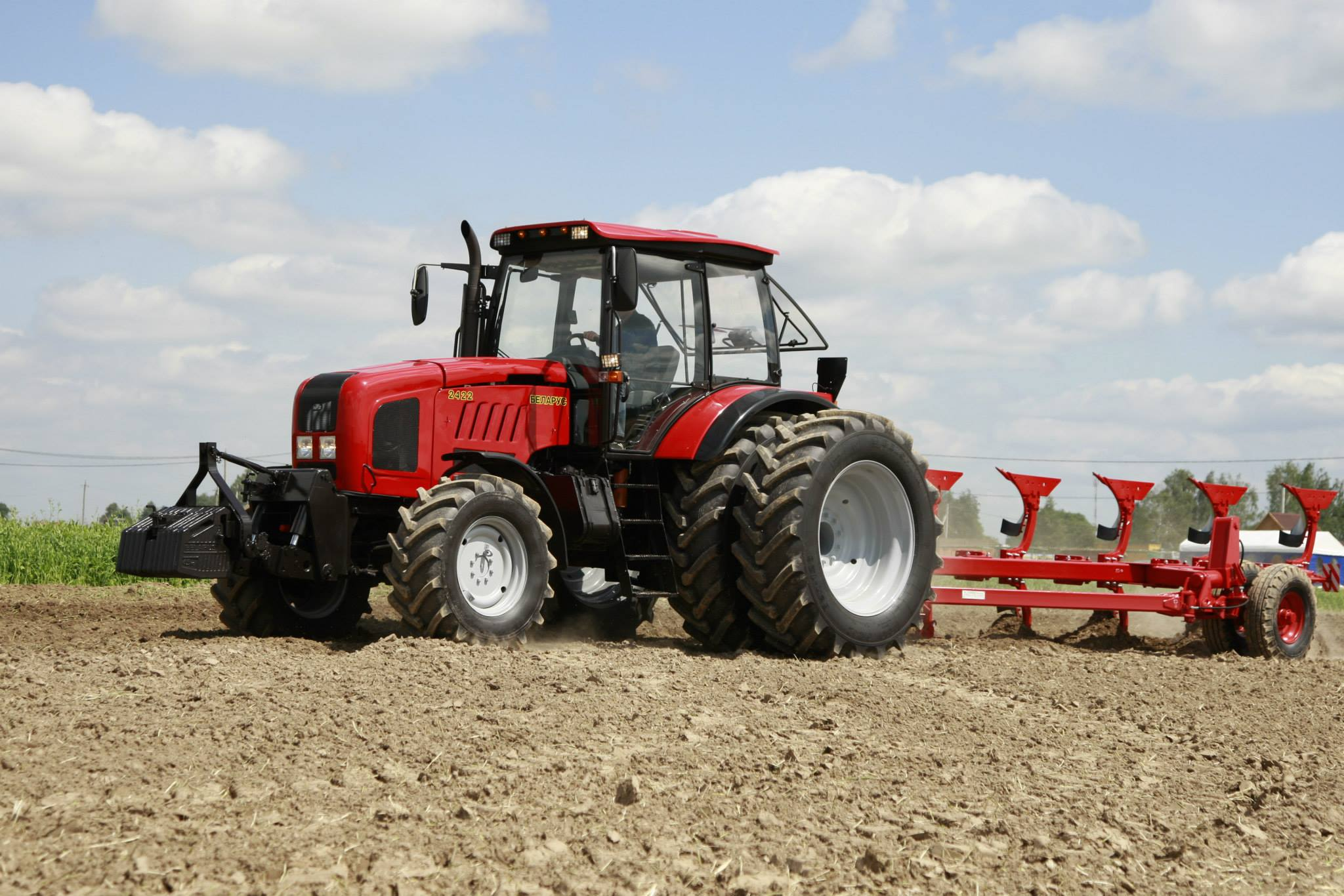
MTZ-2422

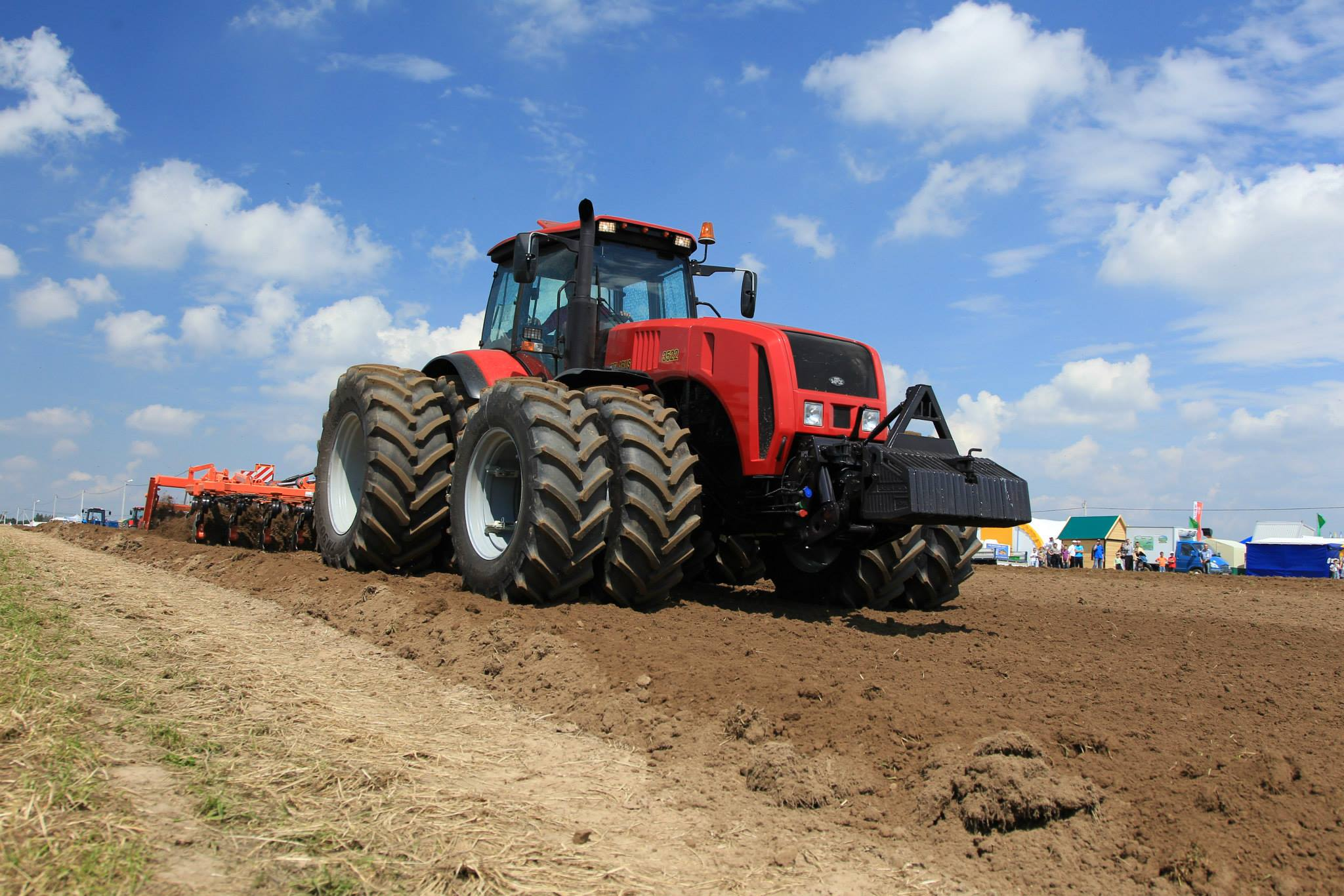
MTZ-3022

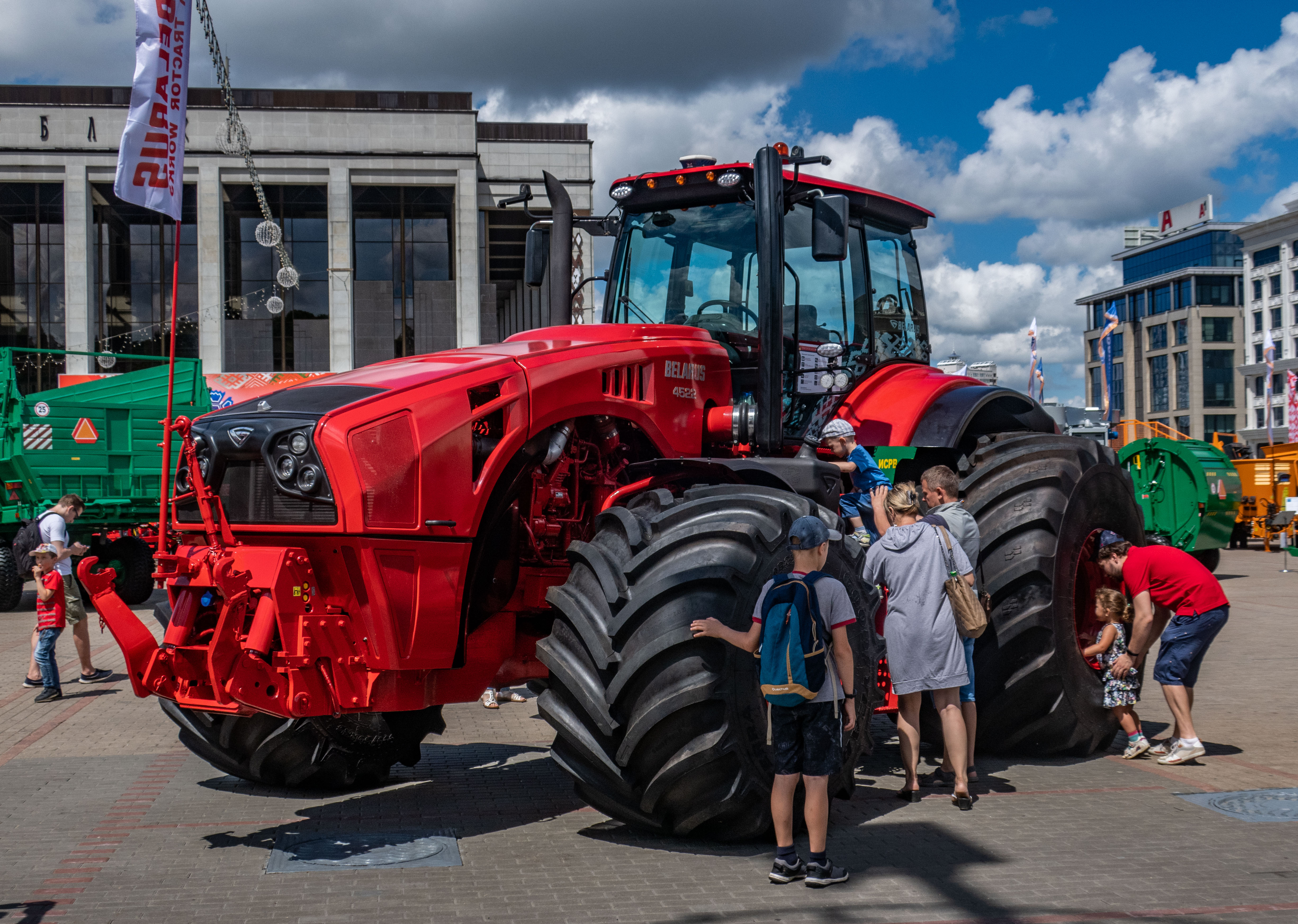
MTZ-4522

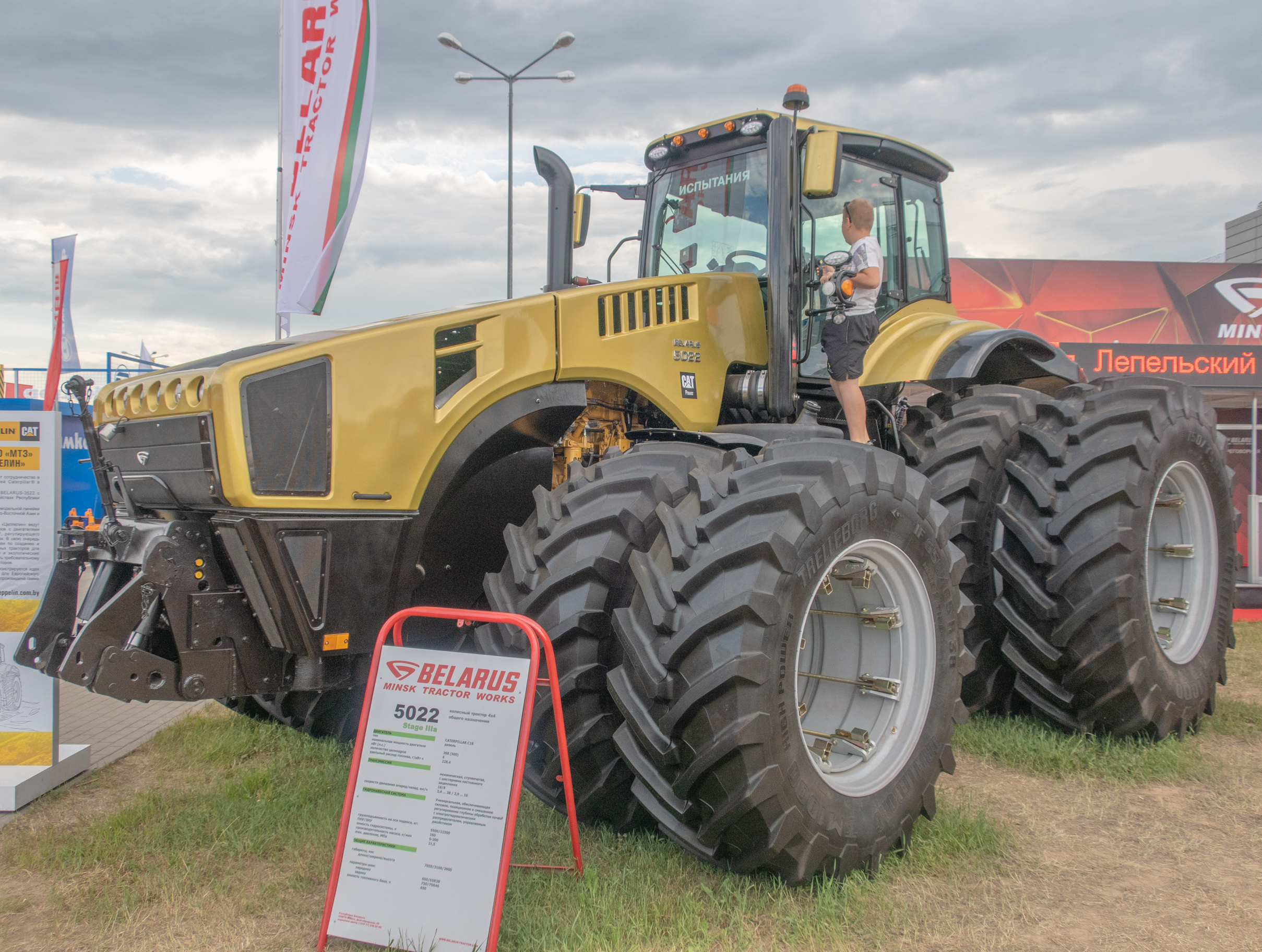
MTZ-5022
