= MTZ black hole =

Black hole solution in 3+1 spacetime with a scalar field

The Martínez–Troncoso–Zanelli (MTZ) black hole is a black hole solution for (3+1)-dimensional gravity with a minimally coupled self-interacting scalar field. It is named after Cristián Martínez, Ricardo Troncoso and Jorge Zanelli who proposed it in 2004.

The event horizon is a surface of constant negative curvature, and the spacetime is asymptotically locally anti-de Sitter.

== See also ==
- BTZ black hole
