= James T. Cushing =

Physicist

- Born: James Thomas Cushing; 4 February 1937; Long Beach, California
- Died: 29 March 2002 (aged 65); South Bend, Indiana
- Education: Loyola University, Chicago (BSc); Northwestern University (MSc); University of Iowa (PhD)
- Scientific career
- Fields: Theoretical physics Philosophy of science
- Doctoral advisor: Max Dresden

James Thomas Cushing (/ˈkʌʃɪŋ/; 4 February 1937 – 29 March 2002) was an American theoretical physicist and philosopher of science. He was professor of physics as well as professor of philosophy at the University of Notre Dame.

== Life and career ==
He studied physics in several universities in the US, obtaining his BSc from Loyola University, Chicago, Illinois in 1959, his MSc from Northwestern University in 1960 and his PhD, also in physics, from the University of Iowa in 1963. He then performed research at the University of Iowa, the Imperial College in London and the Argonne National Laboratory, after which he joined the University of Notre Dame, initially as assistant professor from 1966 to 1969, then advancing to associate professor and, from 1978 onwards, as professor of physics. From 1990 to 1993, he additionally was professor of philosophy at the same university.

Cushing's main areas of research were the history and philosophy of 20th century physics and the foundations of quantum theory. He investigated in particular interpretations of quantum mechanics, including the historical reasons for the success of the Copenhagen interpretation over hidden-variable theories or the de Broglie–Bohm theory (causal interpretation of quantum mechanics).

Since 2004, an annual prize is awarded in honor of James T. Cushing to younger scholars for significant work in the history and philosophical foundations of modern physics.

== Publications ==
James T. Cushing has authored more than 100 scientific articles.

Books

- James T. Cushing, Philosophical Concepts in Physics: The Historical Relation between Philosophy and Scientific Theories, Cambridge University Press, 1998
- J. T. Cushing, A. Fine, S. Goldstein (eds.), Bohmian Mechanics and Quantum-Theory: An Appraisal, Kluwer Academic Publishers, Dordrecht 1996 (Boston Studies in the Philosophy of Science, 184)
- James T. Cushing, Quantum Mechanics: Historical Contingency and the Copenhagen Hegemony, The University of Chicago Press, 1994 ISBN 0-226-13202-1 (cloth) ISBN 0-226-13204-8 (paper)
- James T. Cushing, Theory Construction and Selection in Modern Physics: The S Matrix, Cambridge University Press, 1990
- James T. Cushing and Ernan McMullin (eds.), Philosophical Consequences of Quantum Theory, University of Notre Dame Press, 1989
- James T. Cushing, C. F. Delaney and Gary Gutting (eds.), Science and Reality: Recent Work in the Philosophy of Science, University of Notre Dame Press, 1984
- James T. Cushing, Applied Analytical Mathematics for Physical Scientists, John Wiley and Sons, Inc., 651 pages (1975)
