= (2+1)-dimensional topological gravity =

General relativity in 2+1 dimensions

In two spatial and one time dimensions, general relativity has no propagating gravitational degrees of freedom. In fact, in a vacuum, spacetime will always be locally flat (or de Sitter or anti-de Sitter depending upon the cosmological constant). Because of this property, (2+1)-dimensional topological gravity (2+1D topological gravity) is a topological quantum field theory: the global structure of spacetime is physically relevant, while there are no local gravitational degrees of freedom. Physicists became interested in the relation between Chern–Simons theory and gravity during the 1980s. During this period, Edward Witten argued that 2+1D topological gravity is classically equivalent to a Chern–Simons theory with the gauge group $SO(2,2)$ for a negative cosmological constant, and $SO(3,1)$ for a positive one. One can see this by writing the Einstein-Hilbert action in first order formalism and identifying a particular linear combination of einbein and spin connection with the gauge field. This theory can be exactly solved, making it a toy model for quantum gravity. In this formulation the action can be written using the Killing form of the gauge group together with the Hodge dual operator.

Witten later revisited this interpretation, and argued that nonperturbatively 2+1D topological gravity differs from Chern–Simons because the functional measure is only over nonsingular vielbeins. He suggested the CFT dual is a monster conformal field theory, and computed the entropy of BTZ black holes. Recently, it was discovered that 3D gravity is equivalent to a different TQFT than Chern Simons theory known as Virasoro TQFT. This is obtained by identifying the correct phase space of gravity by excluding singular vielbeins (which is equivalent to looking at the Teichmuller component of the phase space), identifying all solutions related by both small and large diffeomorphisms, and then obtaining the Hilbert space by geometric quantization. The Hilbert space turns out to be generated from Virasoro conformal blocks, hence the name.
