= Claudio Bunster =

Chilean theoretical physicist (born 1947)

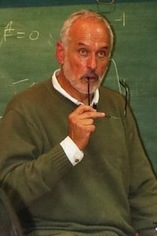
- Claudio Bunster at theoretical physics seminar in Valdivia, Chile.
- Born: April 15, 1947 (age 79); Santiago, Chile
- Known for: Jackiw–Teitelboim gravity; BTZ black hole

Claudio Bunster Weitzman (Latin American Spanish: [ˈklawðjo ˈβunsteɾ]; born April 15, 1947) is a Chilean theoretical physicist. Until 2005 his name was Claudio Teitelboim Weitzman.

== Biography ==
Until 2005 Bunster thought he was the biological son of Volodia Teitelboim, when he learned that his biological father was lawyer Bruno Bunster. He was convinced that this was a machination of the leadership of the Communist Party. He became estranged from his adoptive father, changed his name and did not attend his funeral.

Claudio Bunster attended at Instituto Nacional General José Miguel Carrera, a prestigious public high school of Santiago. Bunster was educated at the University of Chile and Princeton University, where he earned his doctorate in physics in 1973. Bunster has conducted frontier research and taught at Princeton University and at the University of Texas at Austin. He has also been "Long Term Member" of the Institute for Advanced Study at Princeton.

Bunster has been Director of the Center for Scientific Studies (CECS) from its inception in 1984. Originally operating from Santiago, in 2000 this autonomous institute moved South of Chile, Valdivia, in the 40S parallel, where the search has expanded and deepened in the areas of life, our planet and the cosmos.

In addition to his research in theoretical physics and his work as Director of CECs, Bunster has engaged in public service. He was Scientific Adviser to the President during the administration of President Eduardo Frei Ruiz-Tagle (1994–2000). During his tenure as presidential adviser the Presidential Chairs in Science and the Millennium Science Initiative were established. He was also a member of the Panel on Human Rights, established by the government, and involving both the civilian and the military, to address outstanding human rights issues.

Bunster has been especially involved in incorporating the armed forces in scientific endeavors, as a way of strengthening democracy through science. This interest has led to joint work in science among CECs, the Army, Navy and Air Force of Chile and distinguished foreign institutions. Among the fruits of these collaborations are several unprecedented expeditions to Antarctica in which Bunster was directly involved.

He received Chile's National Prize for Exact Sciences in 1995 and was elected to the Academy of Sciences of the United States in 2005 and was made Honorary Member of the Solvay Institutes in Brussels in 2007. The World Academy of Sciences for the advancement of science in developing countries, awarded Bunster in 2013, with the TWAS-Lenovo Prize.
