= Adrienne Kolb =

American historian of science

Adrienne W. Kolb is an American historian of science who worked for many years as the archivist and historian at Fermilab.

== Education and career ==
Kolb studied history at the University of New Orleans, graduating in 1972. She came to Fermilab as an assistant to Lillian Hoddeson in 1983, and retired in 2015.

== Books ==
With Hoddeson and Catherine Westfall, Kolb is the coauthor of the book Fermilab: Physics, the Frontier, and Megascience (University of Chicago Press, 2008).

With Hoddeson and Michael Riordan, Kolb is the coauthor of Tunnel Visions: The Rise and Fall of the Superconducting Super Collider (University of Chicago Press, 2015).

== Personal life ==
Kolb is married to Edward ("Rocky") Kolb, a professor of physics at the University of Chicago.
