= Ivan Akhremchik =

Belarusian artist

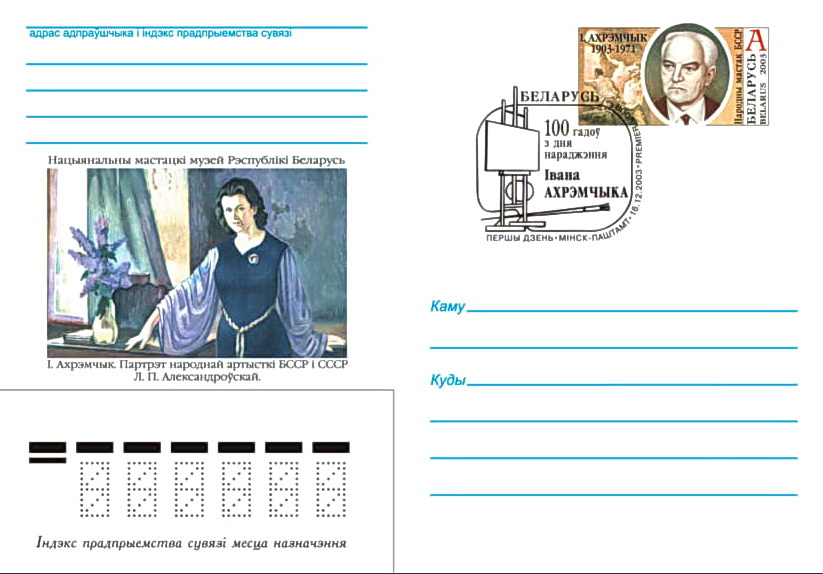
- Artistic envelope depicting a portrait of Akhremchik (on the right) and his painting (on the left)
- Born: December 16, 1903
- Died: March 9, 1971 (aged 67)
- Known for: Portrait

Ivan Osipovich Akhremchik (Belarusian: Іва́н Во́сіпавіч Ахрэ́мчык, Russian: Ива́н О́сипович Ахре́мчик; 16 December 1903, Minsk, Russian Empire - 9 March 1971, Minsk) was a Belarusian painter specializing in portraits. In 1949, he received the title People's Artist of the BSSR.

== Biography ==
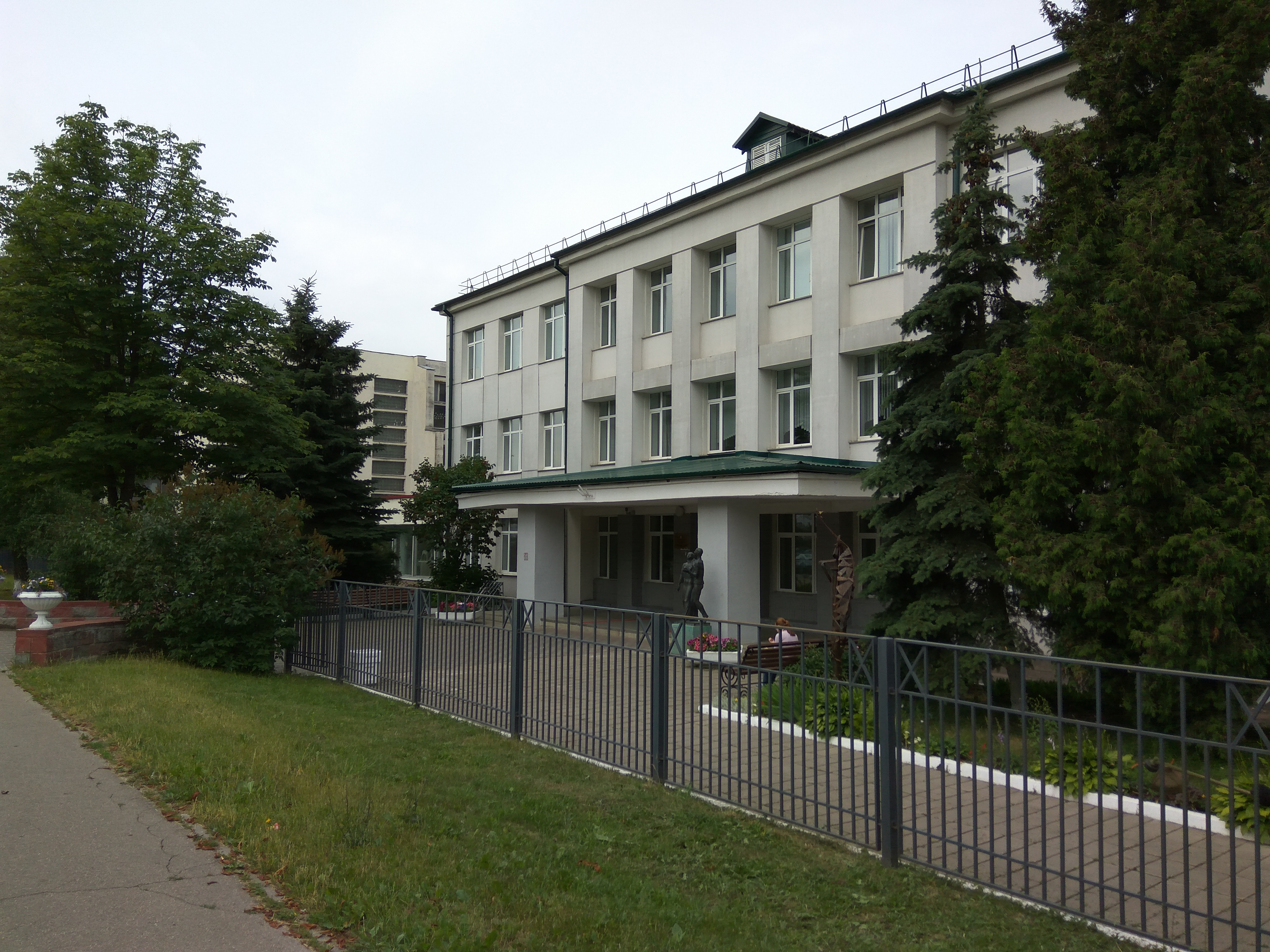
Minsk Art Gymnasium named after Akhremchik

Akhremchik graduated from the Moscow Institute of Arts and Technology in 1930. After graduation, he worked in the genre of easel and monumental painting.

In the 1930s, he painted "The Arrival of the Red Army in Minsk" and "Osintorf". In the post-war period, he painted murals in the Young Spectators' Theatre and the Belarusian Association of the Cultural Union in Minsk, Belarus (together with I. A. Davidovich).

Since 1921, Akhremchik had been taking part in exhibitions of various levels from regional to all-Union.

The most famous works of Akhremchik's easel art is the painting "Defense of the Brest Fortress" and a portrait of the People's Artist of the USSR Gleb Glebov.

In Akhremchik's honor, Belarusian institution “Gymnasium-College of Arts” was named after him in 1971. The institution offers two pathways: music and art. Most of Akhremchik's paintings are displayed in the gymnasium.

The artist's major works are dedicated to the historical-revolutionary and military-patriotic themes:

- "The Signing of the Manifesto on the Creation of the BSSR" (1929);
- "II Congress of the RSDLP" (1932);
- "The Arrival of the Red Army in Minsk in 1920" (1934-1935);
- "Foundation of the Soviet rule in Gomel" (1939-1940);
- "Defenders of the Brest Fortress" (1957-1958);
- "Osintorf" (1931).

The list of his works also includes landscapes "After the Rain" (1945), "July Day" (1960), and "Early Morning" (1963).

== Bibliography ==
- Ива́н О́сипович Ахре́мчик (in Russian)
- Newspaper Izvestiya (in Russian)
- Аладова Е. В. И. О. Ахремчик. — М., 1960.
- Беларуская энцыклапедыя: У 18 т. Т. 2.:Аршыца — Беларусцы. / Рэдкал.: Г. П. Пашкоў і інш. — Мн.: БелЭН, 1996. — 480 с. ISBN 985-11-0061-7 — С. 160.
- Ваданосава Ф. Майстар партрэта Іван Ахрэмчык / Ф. Ваданосава // Роднае слова. — 1993. — № 12. — с. 32.
- Тараканава М. Партрэтны жывапіс Івана Ахрэмчыка: Карціна «Якуб Колас і Янка Купала» / М. Тараканава // Роднае слова. — 2003. — № 12. — с. 68-69.
- Memorial plaque of Akhremchik in Minsk
- Francisk Skaryna by Akhremchik
