= Van Kampen =

Van Kampen is a Dutch toponymic surname meaning "from Kampen", where Kampen usually refers to Kampen, Overijssel. People with this surname include:

- Aad van Kampen (1919–?), Dutch footballer, ADO The Hague, center back, twice Dutch champion
- Claire van Kampen (1953–2025), English director, composer and playwright
- David van Kampen (born 1939), Dutch painter, sculptor and draughtsman
- Egbert van Kampen (1908–1942), Dutch mathematician
  - He devised the Van Kampen theorem in topology and the Van Kampen diagram in group theory
- Jacob van Campen (1596–1657), Dutch artist and architect
- Johannes van Kampen (1899–1969), Dutch sprinter
- Judith van Kampen (born 1978), Dutch softball player
- Michiel van Kampen (born 1976), Dutch baseball player
- Nico van Kampen (1921–2013), Dutch theoretical physicist
  - He pioneered the Van Kampen's expansion, technique in the analysis of stochastic processes
- Nicolaas Godfried van Kampen (1776–1839), Dutch Mennonite author and deacon
- Paul van Kampen, singer and musician in the rock band Beija Flor
- Pieter Nicolaas van Kampen (1878–1937), Dutch zoologist
- Robert Van Kampen (1938–1999), American businessman and Christian fundamentalist
- Robin van Kampen (born 1994), Dutch chess grandmaster and prodigy
- Stephen van Kampen, singer and musician in the rock band Beija Flor

== See also ==
- Van Campen
- Van Kampen Investments, an American mutual fund company established by Robert Van Kampen
- Van Kempen
