= Kampen =

Campen or Kampen may refer to:

== Places ==
=== Finland ===
- Kampen, the Swedish name of Kamppi, a district in Helsinki

=== Germany ===
- Campen, Germany, a village by the Ems estuary, northwestern Germany, home of the Campen Lighthouse
- Campen Castle, a partially standing castle built in the late 13th century in Lehre, Lower Saxony
- Kampen (Sylt), a municipality on the island Sylt
  - Kampen Lighthouse, a lighthouse on the island of Sylt
- Kampen (mountain), a mountain in Bavaria

=== Netherlands ===
- Kampen, Friesland, a village in the municipality Súdwest-Fryslân
- Kampen, Overijssel, a municipality and town in the Netherlands
  - Kampen railway station, a railway station in Kampen, Overijssel
  - University of Kampen, a historic university in Kampen, Overijssel

=== Norway ===
- Kampen, Norway, a neighborhood in the city of Oslo
- Kampen, Stavanger, a neighborhood in the city of Stavanger

== People ==
- Ranee Campen (born 1989), Thai actress
- Van Kampen, a list of people named Van Kampen
- Van Campen, a list of people named Van Campen

== See also ==
- Kampen Church (disambiguation)
- University of Kampen (disambiguation)
