= Holy Land Experience =

Christian theme park

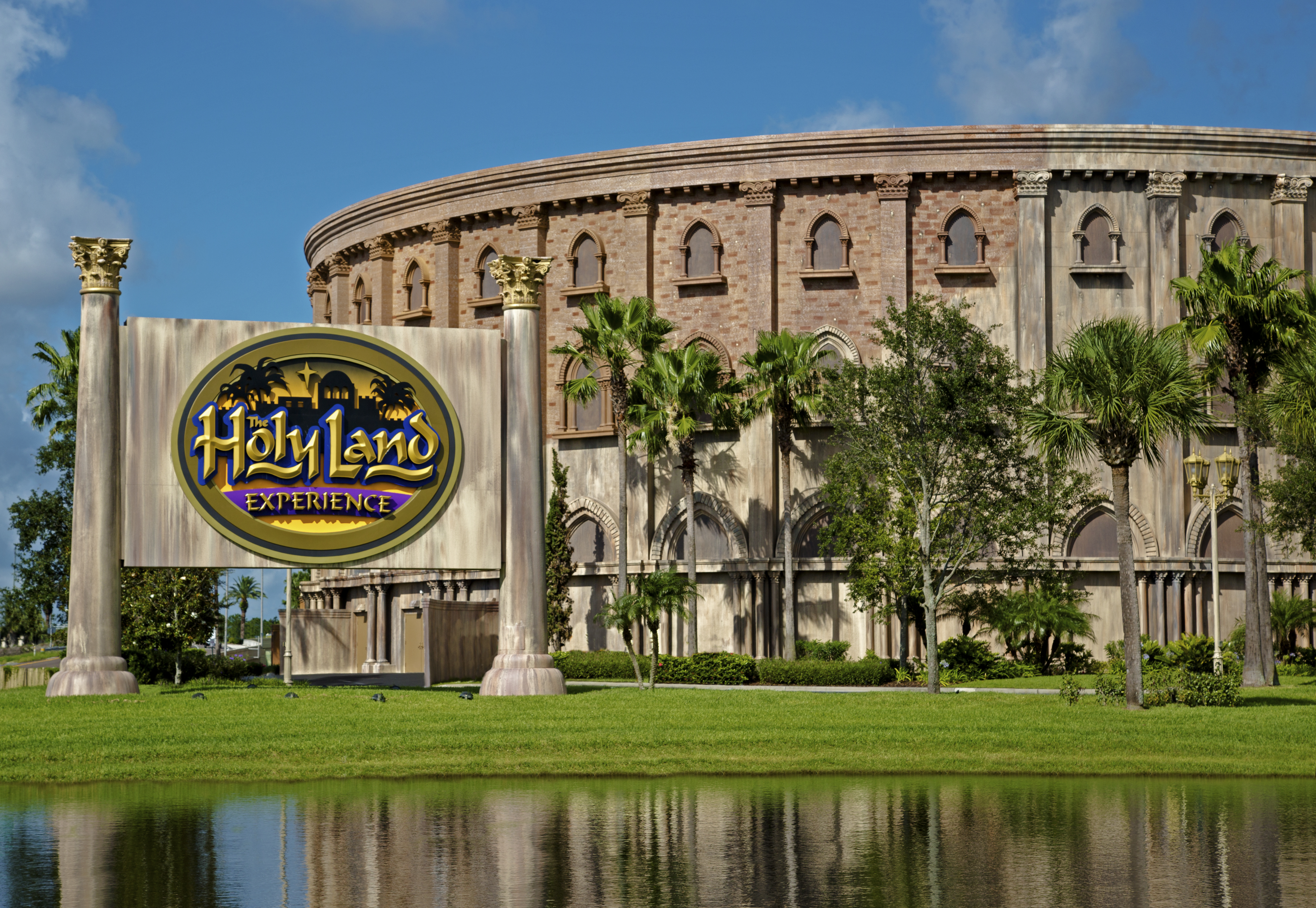
- Church of All Nations at Holy Land Experience
- Interactive map of Holy Land Experience
- Location: Orlando, Florida, United States
- Coordinates: 28°29′46″N 81°25′59″W
- Status: Defunct
- Opened: February 2001
- Closed: March 14, 2020
- Owner: Trinity Broadcasting Network
- Operating season: Year-round

The Holy Land Experience (HLE) was a Christian amusement park in Orlando, Florida and registered non-profit corporation. HLE conducted weekly church services and bible studies for the general public. HLE's theme park recreated the architecture and themes of the ancient city of Jerusalem in 1st-century Judaea. The Holy Land Experience was owned by the Trinity Broadcasting Network. It closed in March 2020. On August 2, 2021, the amusement park was sold to AdventHealth for $32 million.

== History ==
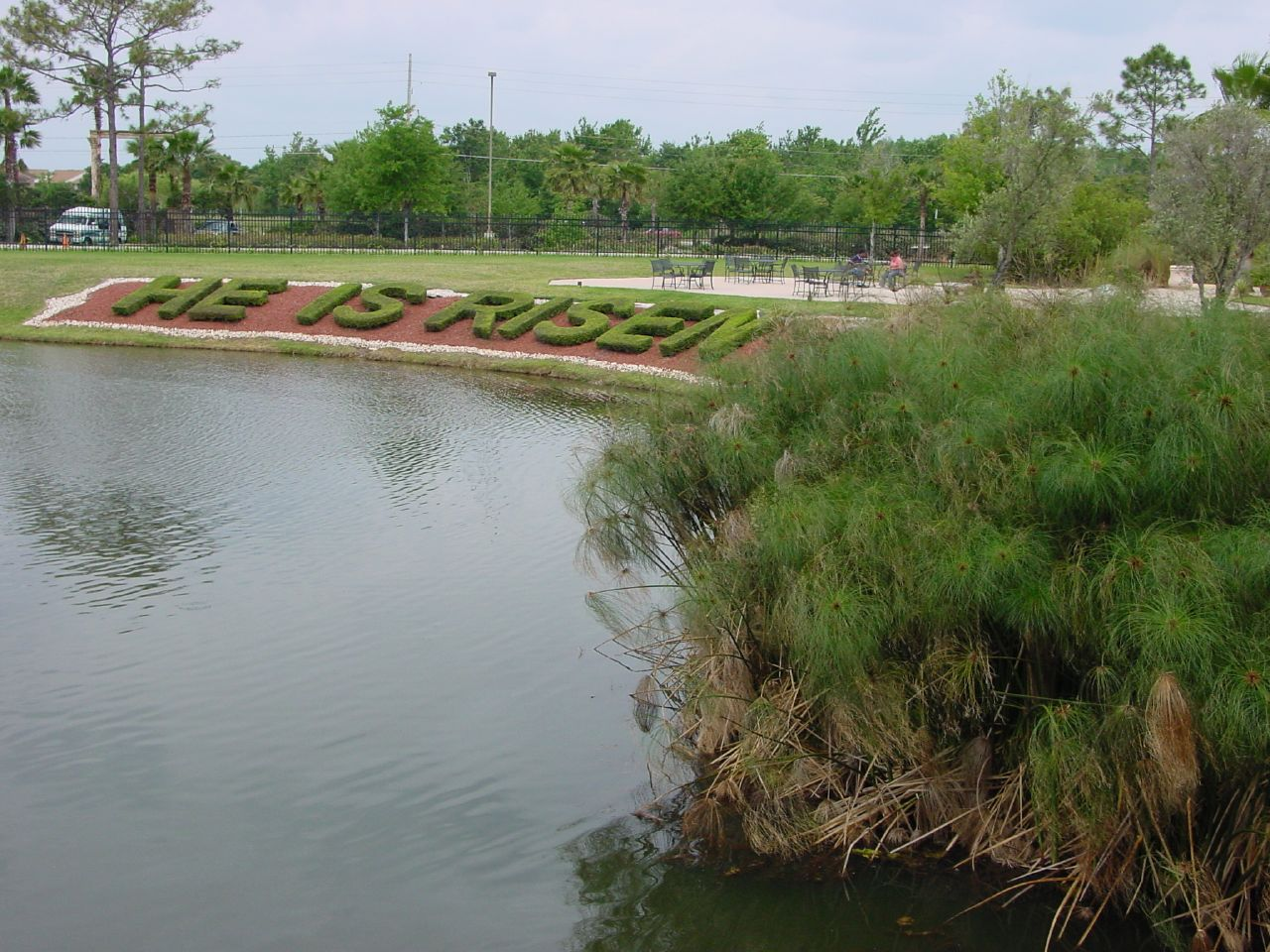
Lake in the center of the park

The park had its origin in a dream of Marvin Rosenthal, a Baptist pastor of Russian Jewish descent, founder of the missionary organization Zion's Hope, who bought land in Orlando in 1989. The park opened in February 2001, and Rosenthal was chief operating officer until 2005.

On August 17, 2002, the Holy Land Experience Scriptorium museum opened. It featured the Van Kampen Collection of biblically related artifacts. The collection included ancient scrolls, manuscripts, and early printed editions of the Bible. The collection was the fourth largest of its kind. The Van Kampen Collection was founded in 1986 by Robert and Judith Van Kampen. In 1994, Robert Van Kampen established a privately funded research library for the purpose of presenting the collection to the academic community as well as the general public. The Scriptorium: Center for Christian Antiquities, located in Grand Haven, MI, housed the Collection. In 2002, the Collection relocated to Orlando, where it was on loan to the Holy Land Experience.

In June 2007, the Holy Land Experience Board of Directors sold the property to the Trinity Broadcasting Network (TBN), for an estimated $37 million. The property was an estimated $8 million in debt at the time of the sale. At that time TBN planned to update the park and use the property to build a Central Florida broadcasting facility, and a movie studio in order to produce Christian films.

On August 21, 2007, former president and board member Tom Powell resigned his position to seek "new challenges." Four people remained on the park's board: Paul Crouch Sr., Jan Crouch, Paul Crouch Jr., and Matthew Crouch. Between 50 and 100 employees lost their jobs when they were cut from the payroll in October 2007. Jan Crouch was Director and CEO until her death in May 2016.

Under TBN’s ownership, The Holy Land Experience underwent construction and the addition of new landscaping, exhibits, restaurants, and theaters which featured live musical and theatrical productions. The park also introduced weekly bible studies, church services and live cooking demonstrations. The Smile of a Child Adventure Land was added to the park exhibits. This children’s park featured exhibits and activities for children, such as a wilderness rock-climbing wall, toy store, children’s theater and craft center.

=== Holy Land Experience mission statement ===
HLE was a non-denominational Christian living biblical museum and church. Church services and bible studies were conducted by ordained pastors for the general public on a weekly basis. HLE was registered as a non-profit corporation with the Florida Department of State Division of Corporations.

=== Church of All Nations ===
In 2012, the 2,000 seat Church of All Nations auditorium opened. The facility featured live presentations and reenactments of the passion and crucifixion of Jesus Christ, and the depiction of the resurrection and ascension of Jesus Christ to heaven. Live tapings of TBN’s flagship TV show, Praise the Lord, were also taped in the facility, in addition to concerts and church services.

=== Closure ===
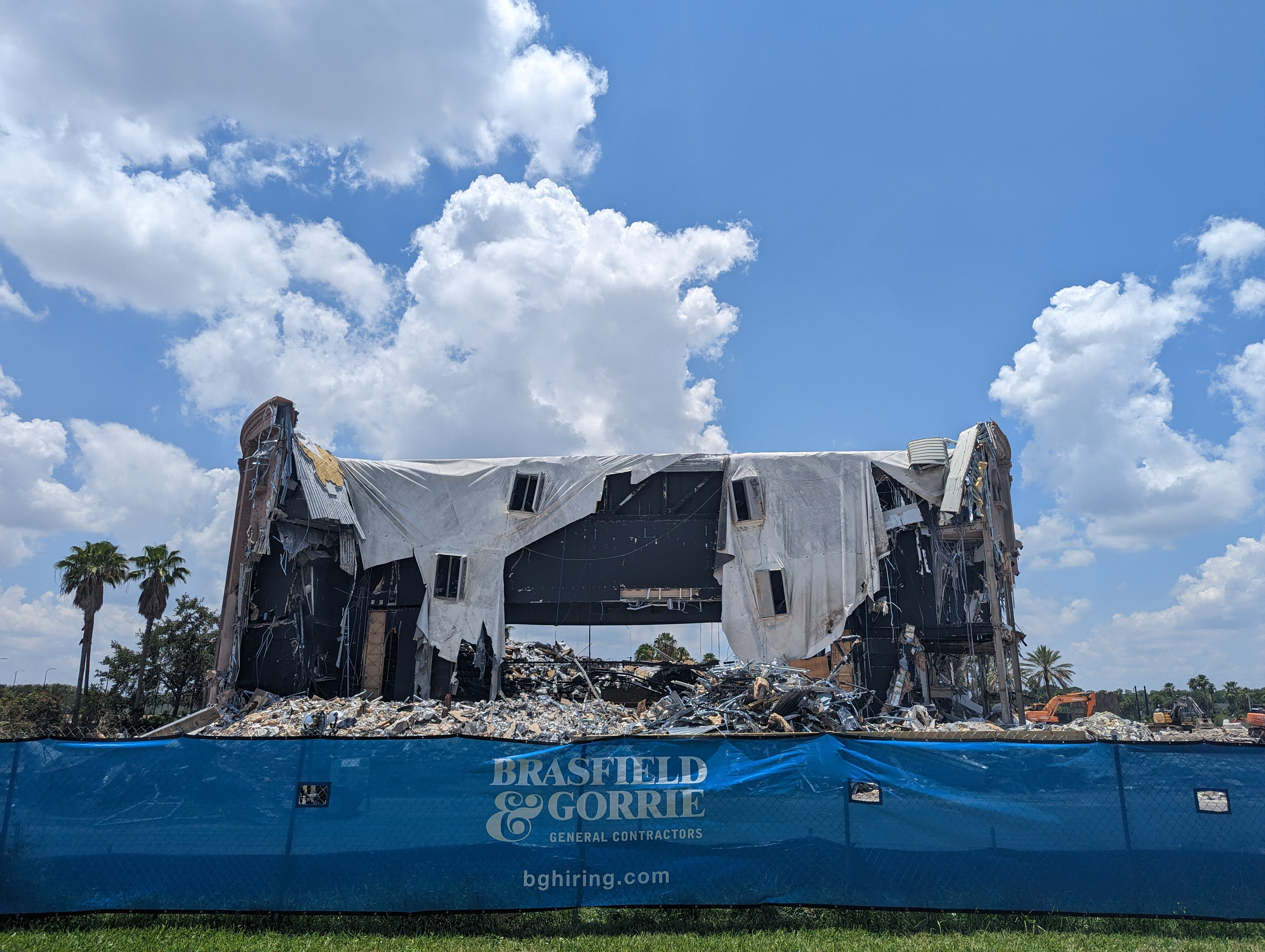
Demolition of the colosseum

In February 2020, after a sharp decline in revenue for several years, the park announced that it would be laying off 118 employees, representing most of its staff, and would be ending all theatrical productions, restaurants and retail shops. On August 2, 2021, the property was sold to AdventHealth for $32 million, the hospital network plans to redevelop the land for a new emergency department, hospital and office building. On April 28, 2023, demolition of the buildings at the former amusement park was started. On June 12, 2023, the last buildings that were demolished were the colosseum and the scriptorium.

== Exhibits ==
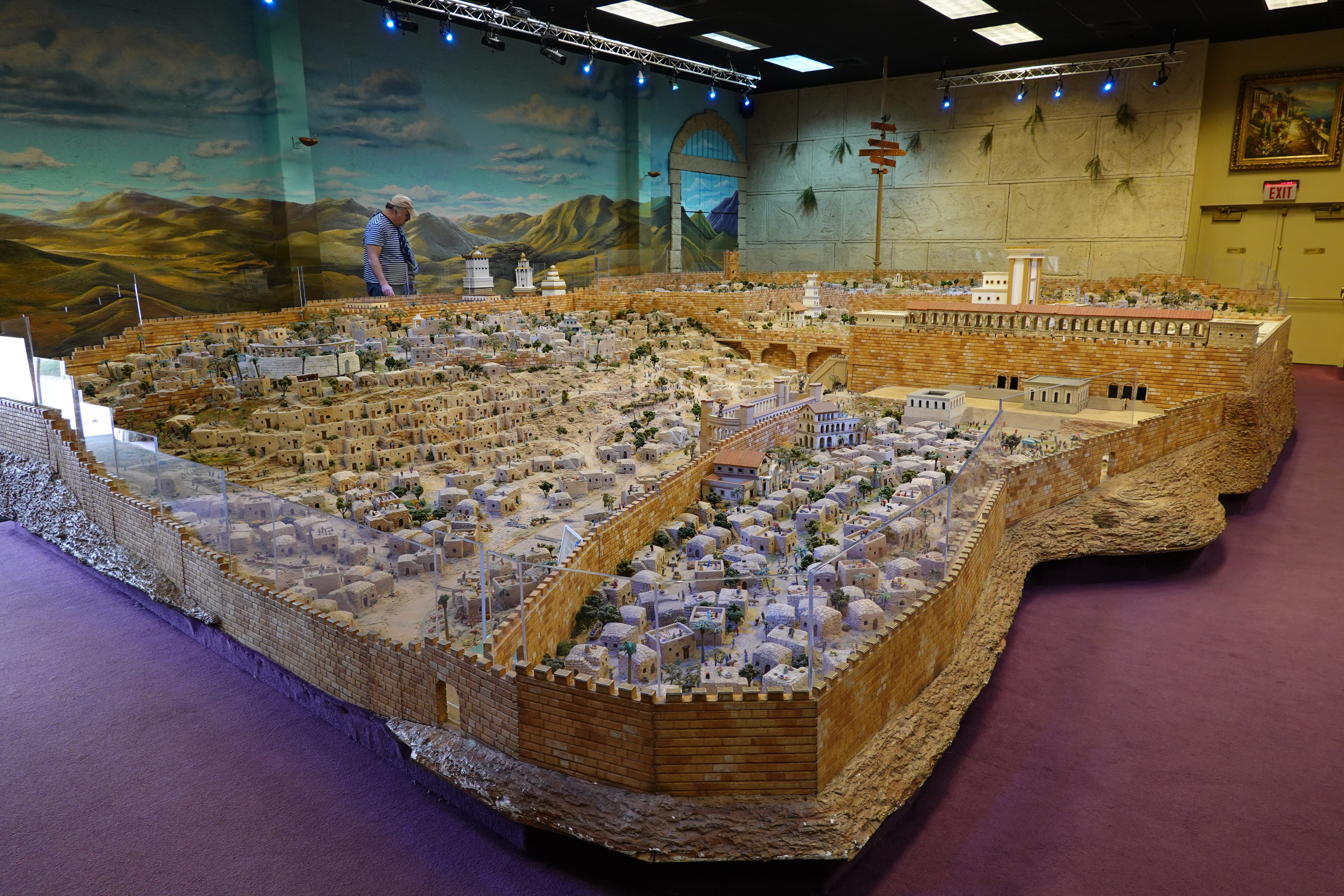
Scale model reconstruction of Jerusalem, A.D. 66 at Holy Land Experience, 2019

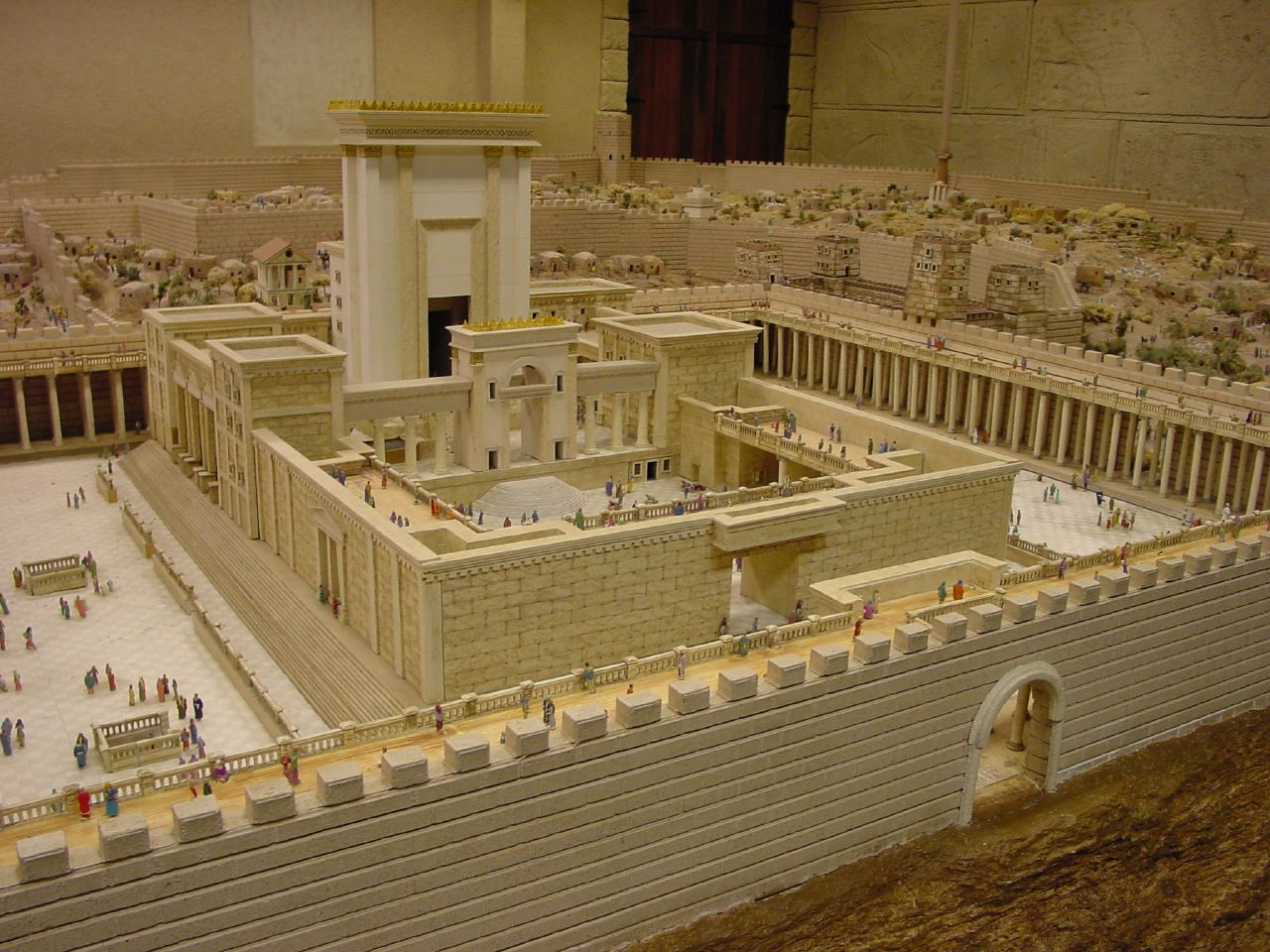
Scale model reconstruction of the Second Temple

There were approximately 43 exhibits in the park.

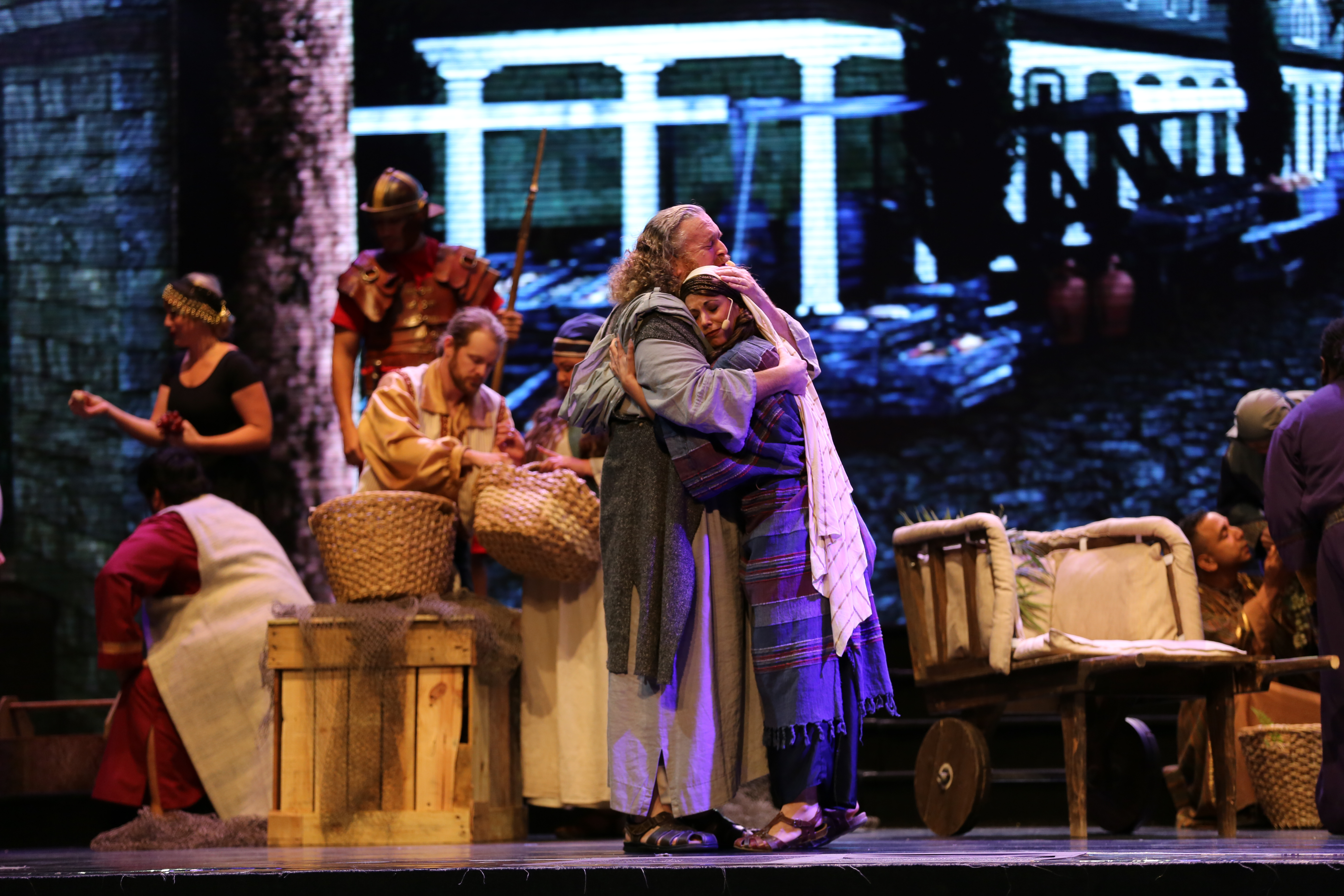
Holy Land Experience – God with us

== Controversies ==
In 2001, the Jewish Defense League accused the Holy Land Experience of proselytizing to Jewish visitors because of the park's and its parent company's status as a Christian missionary organization, claiming that the park was designed to surreptitiously convert Jewish visitors to Christianity. Founder Marvin Rosenthal categorically refuted this accusation, but similar concerns were expressed by other Jewish leaders as well as some Christian observers.

In 2001, Orange County refused the park's tax exemption request. However, in 2005, a judge ruled in favor of the park receiving tax exemption because of its religious mission and not-for-profit status, likening the park to museums whose exhibits present historical information. The law prevented the county government and the state of Florida from collecting the park's previously-owed $300,000 in unpaid yearly property taxes, but required the park to offer an annual free admissions day.

== See also ==
- Heritage USA, a defunct religious theme park.
- Holy Land USA, a similar park in Connecticut.
- Tierra Santa, a similar park in Argentina.
- Bible Land, a roadside attraction in California.
