= First Trust =

First Trust may refer to the following subjects:

- First Trust (company) – American financial services firm
- AIB (NI) – Northern Ireland bank, formerly known as First Trust Bank
- First Trust Building and Garage – Historic American 1927 building
- Albany Trust Company Building – Historic commercial building, listed as First Trust Company Building
