= Intrinsic Noise Analyzer =

intrinsic Noise Analyzer
- Release: April 12, 2012; 14 years ago
- Stable release: 0.4.3 / March 13, 2014; 12 years ago
- Written in: C++
- Operating system: Linux, macOS and Microsoft Windows
- Platform: Qt
- License: GPL
- Website: www.ina.bio.ed.ac.uk

Within bioinformatics, intrinsic Noise Analyzer (iNA) is an open source software for studying reaction kinetics in living cells. The software analyzes mathematical models of intracellular reaction kinetics such as gene expression, regulatory networks or signaling pathways to quantify concentration fluctuations due to the random nature of chemical reactions.

== Background ==
Under well-mixed conditions, the concentrations in living cells are often modeled by a set of deterministic reaction rate equations. This approach frequently becomes inaccurate when some molecular species are present in low molecule numbers per cell because of the randomness inherent in chemical reaction kinetics. This randomness leads to fluctuations in intracellular molecule numbers and hence to cell-to-cell variability. The more accurate stochastic description of these systems is given by the Chemical Master Equation. The latter can be easily simulated by means of Monte Carlo methods such as the stochastic simulation algorithm. This method, however, often becomes computationally inefficient due to the large amount of sampling needed for accurate statistics. iNA provides a more efficient way to obtain the desired statistics via the system size expansion of the Chemical Master Equation, a systematic analytical approximation method.
