= Hans Dekker =

Dutch theoretical physicist

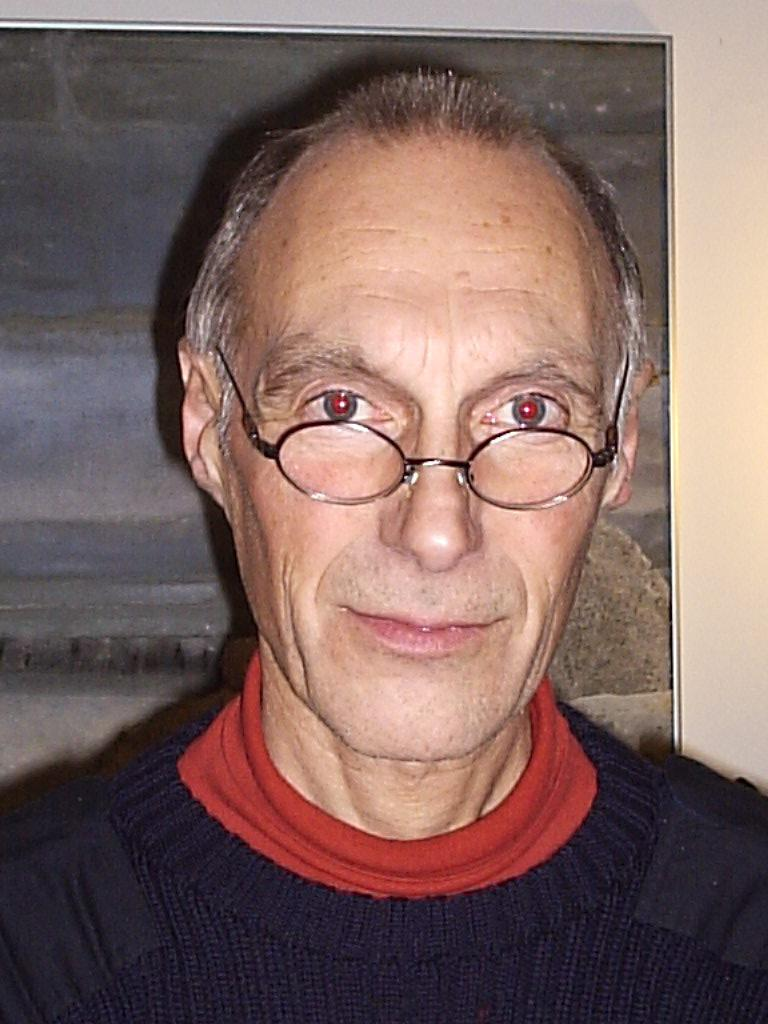
- Born: 18 January 1947 (age 79); Amsterdam, Netherlands
- Education: Delft University of Technology, Utrecht University
- Scientific career
- Fields: stochastic processes, quantum dissipation
- Workplaces: Netherlands Physics Laboratory TNO, Massachusetts Institute of Technology, University of Amsterdam
- Doctoral advisor: Nico van Kampen

Hans J. van Ommeren Dekker (born 18 January 1947 in Amsterdam, Netherlands) is a Dutch theoretical physicist in the line of Dirk Polder, Ralph Kronig, and Nico van Kampen. His scientific work inter alia involves laser theory, path integrals in curved spaces, nonequilibrium statistical mechanics, dissipation in quantum mechanics, and hydrodynamic turbulence. He was director of the Private Institute for Advanced Study in Amsterdam and is professor emeritus at the Institute for Theoretical Physics of the University of Amsterdam.

== Biography ==
Dekker studied physics at Delft University of Technology, in Delft, Netherlands, where he did research in acoustics in the group of Cornelis W. Kosten, and in electron optics with nl:Jan Bart Le Poole.

In 1968 he was also chief editor of the Delft student periodical Het Orakel (for which he inter alia wrote a story about the first successful heart transplant by Christiaan Barnard, Kaapstad, South Africa) while he spent the summer of 1970 with an IAESTE/Nuffic grant working on thermoluminescent dosimeters at Tennessee Valley Authority (TVA), Muscle Shoals, Alabama, United States.

He completed his studies in theoretical physics under the supervision of Dirk Polder (solid-state physics), Ralph Kronig (quantum electrodynamics), and Jaap Kokkedee (quantum field theory and general relativity).

Dekker then joined the staff of the Netherlands Physics Laboratory TNO, in The Hague, where he became head of the Theoretical Physics Group in 1971. Of prime interest at that time was the quantum theory of the laser and in the early seventies he thus got involved in the Synergetics summerschools in Erice, Sicily, Italy, on co-operative phenomena in complex systems, and in 1976 he was visiting scientist at the University of Stuttgart, Germany, in the group of Hermann Haken. In the later seventies his interest in stochastic laser theory lead to several papers on path integrals for nonlinear processes, also in curved Riemannian spaces. Meanwhile he also proposed a mathematical model in theoretical biology on rodent population dynamics.

In 1980 he received a Ph.D. in theoretical physics from Nico van Kampen at Utrecht University, Netherlands, concerning the systematic expansion of the master equation for Markov stochastic processes including a critical point (see also). At about the same time Dekker wrote his monograph 'Classical and quantum mechanics of the damped harmonic oscillator', published in 1981 as a Physics Reports volume, which has become a standard reference for dissipation in quantum mechanics.

During 1981–1982 Dekker was NATO/Fulbright visiting professor at the Department of Chemistry, at the Massachusetts Institute of Technology (MIT) in Boston, United States, with de:Irwin Oppenheim, and at the University of California, San Diego (UCSD), in La Jolla, United States, with Kurt E. Shuler. He further was guest scientist at IBM Thomas J. Watson Research Center, Yorktown Heights United States, in 1988, with Rolf Landauer (on nonequilibrium stochastic processes) and Martin Gutzwiller (on functional integration). From 1985 through 1991 he also was external reviewer in the group of Rudolf de Bruyn Ouboter at the nl:Kamerlingh Onnes Laboratorium (Leiden University) concerning research on macroscopic quantum interference phenomena in Josephson junction devices.

In 1989 he became Lorentz-nl:van Iterson Professor at the Institute for Theoretical Physics (at the time headed by Hans Capel) of the University of Amsterdam. His inaugural lecture (English title: ‘Certain limitations’) is a plea for the concept of stochastic processes, both classical and quantum mechanical (see, e.g., the Capita selecta on 'Dissipative quantum processes' and also the book chapter ‘An educated game of chance in physics’).

Dekker inter alia was visiting professor at the International Center for Theoretical Physics (ICTP) in Trieste, Italy, in 1987 and 1996 (with Lawrence Schulman, on dissipative quantum tunneling; see also) and invited lecturer at the Centennial Meeting of the Fondation Schlumberger/Louis de Broglie in fr:Les Treilles, France, in 1992 (with Tony Leggett, on 'Mesoscopic physics: from dissipative quantum mechanics to non-equilibrium thermodynamics').

From 1998-2018 Dekker also was director of the Private Institute for Advanced Study, in Amsterdam, where he inter alia worked on the stochastic theory of hydrodynamic turbulence.

== Awards ==
- Nuffic Physics Award and Grant (1970)
- J.B. Le Poole nl:Jan Bart Le Poole Science Award (Delft, 1971)
- Royal Dutch Society of Science Award (1981)
- Fulbright Foundation Science Award (1981)
- NATO Fellowship Award (1981/1982)
- Van Schooneveld TNO Netherlands Organization for Applied Scientific Research Prize and Medal (The Hague, 1992)
- Panta Rhei Award (J.M. Burgers nl:Jan Burgers (natuurkundige) Centre , 1994)
- Lawrence Schulman Award (ICTP Trieste, 1996)
- AkzoNobel Science Prize Nomination (1999)
- J.E. Hamilton Foundation Physics Award (2009)

== Publications ==
About 120 articles in refereed journals, and 60 in conference proceedings etc.

== Book ==
- Classical and Quantum Mechanics of the Damped Harmonic Oscillator (North-Holland: Physics Letters Series Vol. 80, Amsterdam, 1981)
