= Tierra Santa =

Tierra Santa is the Spanish term for Holy Land. It may also refer to:

- Tierra Santa (band), heavy-metal band from Spain
- Tierra Santa (theme park), religious theme park in Buenos Aires, Argentina
- Tierrasanta, a community within San Diego, California, US
- Tierra Santa SAS, it's a Colombian chain of low cost clothing operating under the brand name "Tierra Santa Almacén"
