= Kempen =

Kempen may refer to:

== Places ==
- Kempen (Dutch/Belgian region), also called Kempenland or Campine
- Kempen, Germany, a town in North Rhine-Westphalia, Germany
- Kempen Airport, Budel, Netherlands
- Kępno (Kempen in Posen), Greater Poland Voivodeship, Poland

== Other uses ==
- Harry Kempen (1937–2000), Dutch cultural psychologist
- Van Kempen, a surname
- Van Lanschot Kempen, a Dutch management firm

== See also ==
- Kreis Kempen (disambiguation)
