= Brian Wesbury =

American economist

- Born: Brian S. Wesbury; September 8, 1958 (age 68); Ann Arbor, Michigan, U.S.

Academic background
- Education: University of Montana (BA); Northwestern University (MBA)

Academic work
- Discipline: Macroeconomics; Economic forecasting
- Institutions: Wheaton College

Brian S. Wesbury (born September 8, 1958) is an American economist focusing on macroeconomics and economic forecasting. He is the economics editor and a monthly contributor for The American Spectator, in addition to appearing on television stations such as CNBC, Fox Business, Fox News, and Bloomberg TV frequently. He is a member of the Academic Advisory Council of the Federal Reserve Bank of Chicago, and for five years served as an adjunct professor of economics at Wheaton College in Wheaton, Illinois.

Wesbury is currently Chief Economist for First Trust.

== Early life and education ==
Wesbury was born in Ann Arbor, Michigan. He attended Rock Bridge High School in Columbia, Missouri.

In 1981, Wesbury received his BA in Economics from the University of Montana.

Wesbury also attended Northwestern University for graduate level business studies, and received his MBA from Northwestern University's Kellogg Graduate School of Management in 1989.

== Professional career ==
In 1982, Wesbury began his career at the Harris Bank in Chicago.

Wesbury served as Vice President and Economist for the Chicago Corporation from 1990 to 1992 and then as Senior Vice President and Chief Economist for Griffin, Kubik, Stephens, & Thompson, a Chicago Investment Bank from 1992 until 2005, except for 2 years while he served on Capitol Hill.

In 1995 and 1996, Wesbury served as Chief Economist for the Joint Economic Committee of the U.S. Congress.

In October 1999, McGraw-Hill published Wesbury's first book, "The New Era of Wealth".

In 2004, Wesbury was honored by USA Today as one of the top 10 economic forecasters in the United States, and ranked by The Wall Street Journal as the nation's #1 U.S. economic forecaster in 2001.

In October 2009, Wiley & Sons published Wesbury's second book "It's Not as Bad as You Think"

== Chief Economist of the Joint Economic Committee ==
Beginning in January 1995, this Committee provided information for members of the US Congress regarding policy decision-making and economic growth objectives. Here, Wesbury directed and advised committee members and members of congress on policy matters and relating to the United States and other nations.

== Wesbury after government ==
After a 13-year stay as Chief Economist for Chicago investment bank Griffin, Kubik, Stephens, & Thompson, and time away from the private sector to serve in government, Wesbury is currently Chief Economist for First Trust, a financial services firm located in Wheaton, Illinois.

== Bibliography ==
- Brian Wesbury (2000). The New Era of Wealth. McGraw Hill. ISBN 0-07-135180-9.
- Brian Wesbury (2008) The Economy Is Fine (Really), Wall Street Journal Commentary, https://www.wsj.com/articles/SB120147855494820719
- Brian Wesbury (2009). It's Not as Bad as You Think. Wiley. ISBN 978-0-470-23833-2.
- "Brian Wesbury Sees No Recession Ahead", Human Events Interview by Bill Steigerwald, https://web.archive.org/web/20080501031843/http://www.humanevents.com/article.php?id=25189
- "The Budget and the Economy: Brian S. Wesbury Testimony before the Senate Committee on the Budget." Full Text: https://web.archive.org/web/20070201023050/http://budget.senate.gov/democratic/testimony/2002/wesbury_hrng012902.pdf
- "Wesbury "Best Economic Forecaster" Full text: https://www.kellogg.northwestern.edu/kwo/spr04/inbrief/wesbury.htm
- "Fair but Unbalanced" Wall Street Journal full text: http://www.opinionjournal.com/extra/?id=110010446
- "Pouting Pundits of Pessisism" Wall Street Journal full text: http://www.opinionjournal.com/editorial/feature.html?id=110007622
- "Nationally Renowned U.S. Economic Forecaster, Joins The Heartland Institute as Senior Fellow" The Heartland Institute. Press Release http://www.heartland.org/Article.cfm?artId=17250
- "Wesbury Led a Group Of Bears Who Called The Recession of 2001" Wall Street Journal full text: https://web.archive.org/web/20130213091237/http://www.camillieconomics.com/docs/WSJ2002.html
- "Wonderful Wesbury" Rich Karlgaard Forbes Magazine 2004 Full Text: https://www.forbes.com/global/2004/0112/135.html
