= Developmental noise =

Developmental biological concept

Developmental noise or stochastic noise is a concept within developmental biology in which the observable characteristics or traits (phenotype) varies between individuals even though both individuals share the same genetic code (genotypes) and the other environmental factors are completely the same. Factors that influence the effect include stochastic, or randomized, gene expression and other cellular noise.

== Definition ==
Although organisms within a species share very similar genes, similar environments and similar developmental history, each individual organism can develop differences due to noise in signaling and signal interpretation. This developmental noise may help individuals gain the ability to adapt to the environment and contribute to their unique patterns of development. Human fingerprints provide a well-known example; the fingerprints differ even between genetically identical human twins.

== Use of noise in biology ==
Developmental noise may help individuals gain the ability to adapt to the environment. biological systems display both variation and robustness. Natural variation within a population is in large part genetically determined, but variation due to noise may contribute to a rapid response by an individual to changes in the environment. This variation can have an evolutionary tuning effect that contributes to the optimal fitness of a population. In support of this idea, it has been shown that bacteria can switch stochastically into a "persistent" state which has slow growth coupled with an ability to survive antibiotic treatment. In another study, it has been shown that most of the noisy proteins were associated with the stress response. When proteins are expressed in small quantities, the expression of more noisy proteins will be more influenced by noises which come from the environmental context. Types of noises include extrinsic noise which is the variation in cell-to-cell expression level of protein, and intrinsic noise which is the variation of the inherent stochastic nature of protein expression. Moreover, noisy genes are associated with a distinct promoter architecture, including the prevalence of TATA boxes, consistent with the theoretical predictions that noise is greatly influenced by the logic of the transcriptional process itself and, in particular, the transition from closed to open chromatin.

The developmental noise can contribute to unique patterns of development in each individual as well. During development of a complex organ, variability in gene expression may be required to contribute to differentiation of multiple cell types from cells that have equivalent potential. For example, the patterning of the adult fly eye relies on multiple alternative choices of differentiation pathways within an apparently homogeneous field of cells. The facets (ommatidia) in fly eyes occur as two types, designated pale and yellow, as defined by the particular types of rhodopsin photopigments expressed in the two inner photoreceptor cells. In flies carrying mutations in the gene spineless, all ommatidia show the pale fate, while over expression of spineless induces the yellow fate. The final pattern of ommatidia is determined by stochastic variation in expression of this single transcription factor Spineless.

A comprehensive review article summarized effects of noise on cellular decisions from bacteria to mammalian cells.

== Developmental noise in plants ==
The majority of study on developmental noise has focused on animals, but there are also examples from plants. In one early study, Roy made thousands of observations on petal numbers as well as on leaf tooth numbers. He observed a high degree of variability in both traits. After analyzing his data, he could not conclude that the variability was caused by environmental effect. Another example of noise in plants is lateral root behavior. People found that the growth of lateral roots is unpredictable in genetically identical plants which grow in the same environment. One more example of seed germination may illustrate the benefit of developmental noise in plants. Stochasticity in the timing of germination ensures that at least a fraction of the progeny will survive to reproduce.

== Noise and robustness ==
Though stochastic variations in cell behaviors may be beneficial, most biological systems need to maintain a reliable output without unpredictable variations. This ability to buffer variations generated by molecular noise, genetic polymorphism, or environmental fluctuations is termed robustness.

For example, in the development of the repeating blocks of somites in the mesoderm of vertebrate animals, even though the biological system may be subject to a noisy environment, the segmentation clock maintains periodic gene expression through coupled oscillators, in which synchronous oscillation of neighbors is maintained through mutual coupling. This mechanism enables embryos to maintain a constant segregation of somites, despite the noise imposed by the high level mitosis required for continued growth.

== Further study ==
The sources, consequences, and control of noise are major questions in study of developmental noise. Recent studies suggest that this noise has multiple sources, including the stochastic or inherently random nature of the biochemical reactions of gene expression. But the detailed mechanisms are still unclear and the contributions of factors such as microRNAs, whose existence was first discovered in the 1990s, remain unclear. For example, one recent study showed that microRNAs can serve different roles, from using noise to throw a developmental switch to buffering the consequences of noise in order to confer robustness to environmental perturbation. Thus, much work remains to be done in understanding the significance, control and mechanisms of developmental noise.

== See also ==
- Canalisation (genetics)
