= Marvin Rosenthal =

American evangelist and writer (1935–2022)

- Born: Marvin Jerald Rosenthal; October 14, 1935; Philadelphia, Pennsylvania, U.S.
- Died: January 8, 2022 (aged 86); Winter Garden, Florida, U.S.
- Occupations: Pastor, author, missionary, theme park founder
- Known for: Founder of Zion’s Hope and The Holy Land Experience
- Spouse: Marbeth Rosenthal

Marvin Jerald Rosenthal (October 14, 1935 – January 8, 2022) was a Baptist pastor, author, missionary, and founder of Zion's Hope and The Holy Land Experience, a Bible-themed park in Orlando, Florida. A Jewish convert to Christianity, he was active in evangelical missions to Jewish communities but was also a vocal opponent of the Messianic Jewish movement.

== Early life and education ==
Rosenthal was born in Philadelphia, Pennsylvania to Yetta Rosenthal, a single mother who raised three sons in the Strawberry Mansion neighborhood of the city. His grandparents were Jewish immigrants who fled Russia to escape antisemitic pogroms. Raised in an observant Jewish environment, Rosenthal was bar mitzvahed and attended a Conservative synagogue.

His mother converted to Christianity after encountering a Christian missionary, which led to estrangement from the local Jewish community. Rosenthal himself converted to Christianity at age 15. He later served in the United States Marine Corps, worked briefly as a dance instructor, and pursued religious training at the Philadelphia College of the Bible and Dallas Theological Seminary.

== Career and ministry ==
Rosenthal was ordained as a Baptist minister in 1968 and became pastor of a Baptist church in Pemberton, New Jersey. He then joined the Friends of Israel Gospel Ministry, where he was executive director and edited the organization's magazine, Israel My Glory, for over 16 years.

Rosenthal opposed Messianic Judaism. In 1975, he helped draft a resolution for the Fellowship of Christian Testimonies to the Jews (FCTJ), denouncing Messianic congregations that mimicked synagogues and included Jewish ritual as "pseudo-cultural pride." He maintained that Jewish converts should worship alongside Gentile Christians in local churches.

In 1989, Rosenthal was dismissed from the Friends of Israel after a dispute over his views on the timing of the Rapture. He had developed that interpretation with Robert Van Kampen. He founded Zion's Hope, a missionary organization based in Florida, and began publishing Zion’s Fire magazine.

== The Holy Land Experience ==
Rosenthal founded The Holy Land Experience, a 15-acre biblical theme park in Orlando that opened in 2001. Developed by Zion's Hope, the park featured reconstructions of ancient Jerusalem, the Qumran Caves, Herod's Temple, and the Garden Tomb.

The park drew criticism from Jewish organizations who viewed it as a tool for proselytizing Jews. The Jewish Defense League protested its opening, and critics argued that some exhibits (such as a presentation at the Wilderness Tabernacle ending with images of Jesus and Mary) presented Jewish history through an explicitly Christian theological framework.

Rosenthal denied these accusations, stating, "My goal is to share the truth of the word of God to all people, including Jewish people."

The park exceeded its projected attendance figures. Rosenthal later said that publicity surrounding the protests had increased public attention. He said that "The storm of publicity has done more for us than millions of dollars in advertising could have accomplished."

== Writings ==
Rosenthal authored several books on Christian theology and prophecy, including:

- Not Without Design. West Collingswood, NJ: Friends of Israel Gospel Ministry, 1980.
- The Pre-Wrath Rapture of the Church. Nashville: Thomas Nelson, 1990.
- The Feasts of the Lord. Orlando, FL: Zion's Hope, 1997.

== Personal life ==
Rosenthal was married to Marbeth Rosenthal and had one son, David, who succeeded him as the leader of Zion's Hope.

== Death ==
Rosenthal died on January 8, 2022, in Winter Garden, Florida, at the age of 86.
