= Beija Flor =

Canadian indie rock band

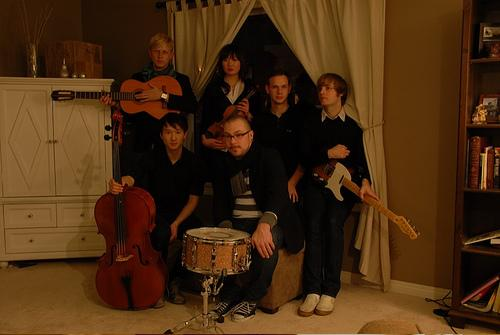
- L-R, Stephen van Kampen, Hoyee Wong, Paul van Kampen, Brett Gunther, Henry Hseih, Matthew Bayliff of Beija Flor

Background information
- Origin: Calgary, Alberta, Canada
- Genres: Indie rock Progressive rock
- Years active: 2003-2010
- Labels: Vulpine Records
- Members: Stephen van Kampen; Paul van Kampen; Hoyee Wong; Henry Hsieh; Brett Gunther; Dan Wilson; Matthew Bayliff; Jon Reddit

Beija Flor was an indie rock band formed in Calgary, Alberta, in 2003. The band was made up of Stephen van Kampen (vocals, guitar), Paul van Kampen (vocals, piano), Dan Wilson (vocals, drums), Brett Gunther (vocals, guitar), Henry Hsieh (vocals), (bass), and Hoyee Wong (vocals, violin). The band was known for its self-orchestrated light shows, consisting of colored and strobe lights controlled by Stephen through a circuit of foot switches. "Beija-flor" means "hummingbird" in Portuguese.

== History ==
Beija Flor was formed in 2003 by brothers Stephen and Paul van Kampen, Matt Bayliff, and Jon Reddit. In 2005, they released their debut album, The Quiet One and the Lonely One.

Reddit left the band and Stephen and Paul's long-time friend Brett Gunther took the vacant guitar spot. Henry Hsieh and Hoyee Wong joined the band in late 2006.

In 2007, they released their second album Beija Flor Presents The American. which was produced by The Summerlad's Arran Fisher and recorded by Fisher and Diego Medina. The single, The American reached No. 1 in the Top 30 most requested songs on Calgary's CJSW radio for the week ending January 15, 2008. Beija Flor was also featured on CBC Radio 3 across Canada on various New Music segments.

In the spring of 2009, Bayliff left the band and was replaced by Dan Wilson. The band broke up in 2010.

In 2011, Wilson and the van Kampen brothers formed the band The Magnetic North (not to be confused with the British band of the same name). Hsieh co-founded the band Friendo and Reddit became a member of War Baby.

== Discography ==
Albums

- The Quiet One and the Lonely One (2005), Vulpine Records
- Beija Flor Presents The American (2007), Independent

Compilation inclusion

- Megatunes 21st Anniversary Compilation (2009), Independent

== See also ==
- Canadian rock
- List of bands from Canada
- List of Canadian musicians
- Category:Canadian musical groups
