= University of Kampen =

Since the schism in 1944 there are two theological universities in Kampen:

University of Kampen may refer to:

- Theological University of the Reformed Churches, a seminary in the Dutch city of Kampen
- Protestant Theological University, in the Dutch city of Kampen

== See also ==
- Kampen (disambiguation)
