= Kampen Church =

Kampen Church may refer to:

- Kampen Church, Oslo, in Oslo, Norway
- Kampen Church, Stavanger, in Rogaland county, Norway

== See also ==
- Kampen (disambiguation)
