= First Trust (company) =

American financial services firm

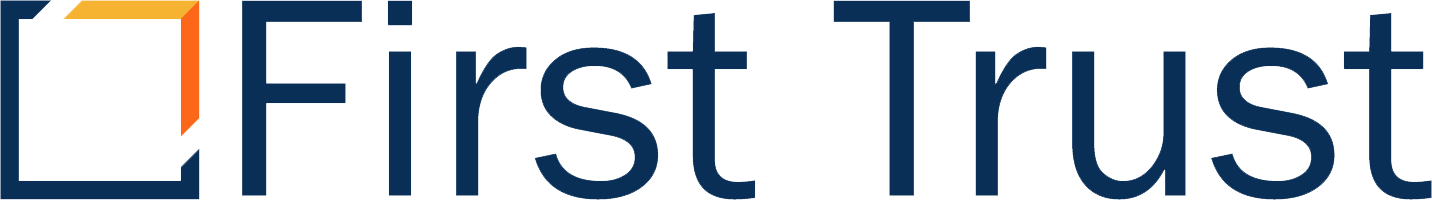
- Formerly: Nike Securities
- Company type: Private
- Industry: Financial services
- Predecessor: Clayton Brown & Associates
- Founded: September 1991; 34 years ago
- Founder: Robert Van Kampen
- Headquarters: Wheaton, Illinois, U.S.
- Key people: James Bowen (CEO); Brian Wesbury (Chief Economist)
- Products: Exchange-traded funds; Unit investment trusts; Mutual funds; Separately managed account
- AUM: US$218 billion (April 2024)
- Number of employees: 637 (2023)
- Website: www.ftportfolios.com

First Trust is an American financial services firm based in Wheaton, Illinois. The firm is primarily engaged in issuing exchange-traded fund (ETF) products. However, it is also involved with other products such as unit investment trusts (UIT), mutual funds, and separately managed accounts for institutional investors.

First Trust was one of the first ETF providers to offer smart beta funds and thematic ETFs. Despite being one of the largest ETF issuers as well as UIT issuers, the firm has maintained a low profile.

== Background ==
In 1967, Robert Van Kampen, who had previously worked at Nuveen, co-founded an investment banking firm, Van Kampen, Wauterlek & Brown, which was later renamed to Clayton Brown & Associates. In 1974, he left the firm to found another firm, Van Kampen Merritt, that was later acquired by Xerox in 1984.

In September 1991, Van Kampen founded another firm named Nike Securities in Chicago after Xerox announced it would discontinue its investment banking business to focus on asset management products such as UITs. Nike Securities acquired the UIT business from Clayton Brown & Associates and added 40-50 employees. At the time, Clayton Brown & Associates had sponsored more than $6 billion of UIT under the First Trust name, and the UIT division accounted for 30% of its business. James Bowen, who was previously the head of the UIT division, was selected to head up the new operation at Nike Securities.

On October 29, 1999, Van Kampen died, leaving speculation on whether his family would consider selling or entering a strategic alliance regarding Nike Securities. At that time, Nike Securities sold over $5 billion annually in UITs and administered $15.2 billion in UIT assets. With a pretax profit of $9 million, it was estimated Nike could fetch $45 million to $63 million in a sale.

Nike Securities was later rebranded to First Trust, the brand name under which its UIT products were sold.

In December 2006, First Trust launched the First Trust Value Line Dividend Index on the American Stock Exchange which was the first closed-end fund to convert to an ETF.

In 2010, Bowen bought First Trust from Van Kampen's family, making him the firm's owner.

In the first quarter of 2013, First Trust entered the European ETF market by launching three smart beta ETFs.

According to The Wall Street Journal in 2019, First Trust is the sixth largest employer of Wheaton is one of the top three employers of Wheaton College graduates.

First Trust's success in the ETF business is due to several factors. It tends to ignore fee wars and charges higher fees compared to its peers. The firm has been noted to offer unique strategies in its product lineup that cannot be found elsewhere. First Trust also focuses on the retail advisor market and relies on strong relationships with investment advisors to sell the products to the clients. It does not offer Robo-advisor services.

Some financial journalists and Financial Industry Regulatory Authority have suggested that First Trust has a culture of hyper-aggressive sales tactics that skirts the fiduciary duty of the financial advisers that form the core of the ETF customer base.

== Controversial tweets by First Trust executives ==
Business Insider has reported that First Trust's executives have posted controversial comments on Twitter under their real names and titles. Chief economist Brian Wesbury tweeted that COVID-19 vaccine mandates were similar to slavery, George Floyd protests were riots done by thugs, and that every clerk should be fired as a result of the leak regarding Supreme Court overturning Roe v. Wade. Deputy chief economist Bob Stein stated the George Floyd protests should be described as pogroms and tweeted at the New York Yankees Twitter account to mock it for tweeting facts about gun violence after the 2022 Buffalo shooting. Although both did get temporarily suspended from Twitter, they did not seem to get in trouble with the company or its clients. It was speculated that they evaded more blowback since First Trust is a private company. In 2017, Bowen told the audience at the Fearless Investing Summit that his company was "privately held, so if you hate me, I could care less."
