= Robert Pierre (musician) =

American singer (born 1992)

- Born: Robert Scott Pierre; October 17, 1992 (age 33)
- Origin: Orlando, Florida, U.S.
- Genres: CCM, teen pop
- Occupations: Singer, songwriter
- Instruments: Vocals, guitar
- Years active: 2005–present
- Labels: Beatmart, Thinkabouit
- Website: robertpierre.com

Robert Scott Pierre (born October 17, 1992) is a Contemporary Christian musician, songwriter and guitarist from Orlando, Florida.

== Early life and education ==
He is the son of Karla and Scott Pierre, and the grandson of Robert Van Kampen.

Pierre grew up in Windermere, Florida and attended school at the First Academy, a school run by the First Baptist Church of Orlando.

== Career ==
Pierre's career began as a boy soprano with a voice that the Orlando Sentinel described as "reminiscent of Michael Jackson's from the Jackson Five era."

His debut album, Inside Out, was released on November 7, 2006 and produced by Al Denson. Pierre's second album, titled Identity, was originally released in November 2008; it was re-released in April 2009 with three additional tracks, including the radio single "Jesus".

In 2010 he performed together with Sidewalk Prophets and Revive as the warm-up acts on a Winter Jam tour.

His next album, I'm All In was released on July 18, 2011 and, on October 18, 2017, his fourth album, Nothing Without You, was released by Thinkaboutit Records.

== Discography ==
=== Studio albums ===
- Inside Out (2006)
- Identity (2008)
- I'm All In (2011)
- Nothing Without You (2017)

=== Singles ===
- "Eternal"
- "Possible"
- "Jesus"
- "Stranger in This Land"
