= Van Kempen =

Van Kempen is a Dutch toponymic surname meaning "from Kempen", a German city at the Dutch border. The Kempen region of the Low Countries is also a possible origin, e.g. in the case of Ludwig van Kempen. People with this name include:

- Ad van Kempen (1944–2026), Dutch film actor
- Kenneth van Kempen (born 1987), Dutch basketball player
- Ludwig van Kempen (1304–1361), Flemish Benedictine monk and music theorist
- Michiel van Kempen (born 1957), Dutch writer, art historian and literary critic
- Paul van Kempen (1893–1955), Dutch conductor
- Piet van Kempen (1898–1985), Dutch racing cyclist
- Richard van Kempen (born 1964), Dutch speed skater
- Thomas van Kempen (circa 1380–1471), Dutch theologian a.k.a. Thomas à Kempis

== See also ==
- Van Kampen
- Kempen (disambiguation)
