= Robert Van Kampen =

American businessman and evangelical financier (1938 – 1999)

- Born: Robert D. Van Kampen; December 16, 1938; Evergreen Park, Illinois, U.S.
- Died: October 29, 1999 (aged 60); Loyola University Medical Center, U.S.
- Education: Wheaton College
- Occupation: Businessman Author
- Known for: Founder of Van Kampen Investments and First Trust
- Children: 3
- Relatives: Robert Pierre (grandson)

Robert D. Van Kampen (December 16, 1938 – October 29, 1999) was an American businessman and author who served as a member of various organizational boards in the business world and Christian ministry.

Van Kampen's business career took him into the investment banking world, and he became one of the wealthiest men in the United States after founding the investment banking firm Van Kampen Merritt (later renamed to Van Kampen Investments) in 1974. In 1991, he founded another firm named Nike Securities which was later renamed to First Trust.

== Business career ==
Van Kampen was born on December 16, 1938, in Evergreen Park, Illinois. Van Kampen was educated at Wheaton Academy in West Chicago and Wheaton College in Wheaton, Illinois, graduating in 1960. After graduation he worked at Nuveen as a bond salesman where he was known as "The Charger" due to his ambition and drive.

In 1967, Van Kampen left Nuveen over a compensation dispute and co-founded an investment banking firm, Van Kampen, Wauterlek & Brown which was later renamed to Clayton Brown & Associates. In 1974, he left the firm to found another firm, Van Kampen Merritt that was later acquired by Xerox in 1984.

From 1980 to 1992, Van Kampen was also a partner in VMS Realty.

In September 1991, Van Kampen founded another firm named Nike Securities in Chicago. It would be later renamed to First Trust.

== Religious views ==
As an evangelical Christian, Van Kampen was known for applying biblical principles to the running of his business, and there was a strict code of personal conduct among his many employees. Divorce was frowned upon and the drinking of hard liquor discouraged.

In the 1980's, Van Kampen was involved with the Master's College (now Master's University) and the Master's Seminary, participating on a committee of two other men to develop a consistent Statement of Faith between the schools and the host church, Grace Community Church, which was under the direction of the late Dr. John MacArthur. Van Kampen was also a major donor to MacArthur's radio ministry, "Grace to You".

In the 1990s, Van Kampen developed, with Rev. Marvin Rosenthal, what is known today in evangelical Christian eschatology as the "Pre-Wrath” rapture position, authoring three books on the subject. His views on the Prewrath Rapture resulted in his eventual separation from MacArthur's associated ministries, since MacArthur adhered to the pretribulational rapture view.

His family foundation owns one of the largest private collections of rare and antique Bibles in North America, which was housed in the Scriptorium at the Holy Land Experience in Orlando, Florida.

== Personal life ==
In 1963 Van Kampen married, and he and his wife had three children. Having initially lived in Wheaton, Illinois, Van Kampen made his home in West Chicago, Illinois, Indiana, and West Michigan. Van Kampen died on October 29, 1999, at the age of 60 in Loyola University Medical Center while waiting for a heart transplant.

Christian singer Robert Pierre, son of Van Kampen's daughter Karla and Scott Pierre, is Van Kampen's grandson.

== Publications ==
- Van Kampen, Robert (1997). The Fourth Reich. Revell.
- Van Kampen, Robert (1997). The Rapture Question Answered: Plain and Simple. Revell.
- Van Kampen, Robert (2000). The Sign (3rd revised ed.). Crossway Books.
