= First Trust Building and Garage =

- U.S. National Register of Historic Places
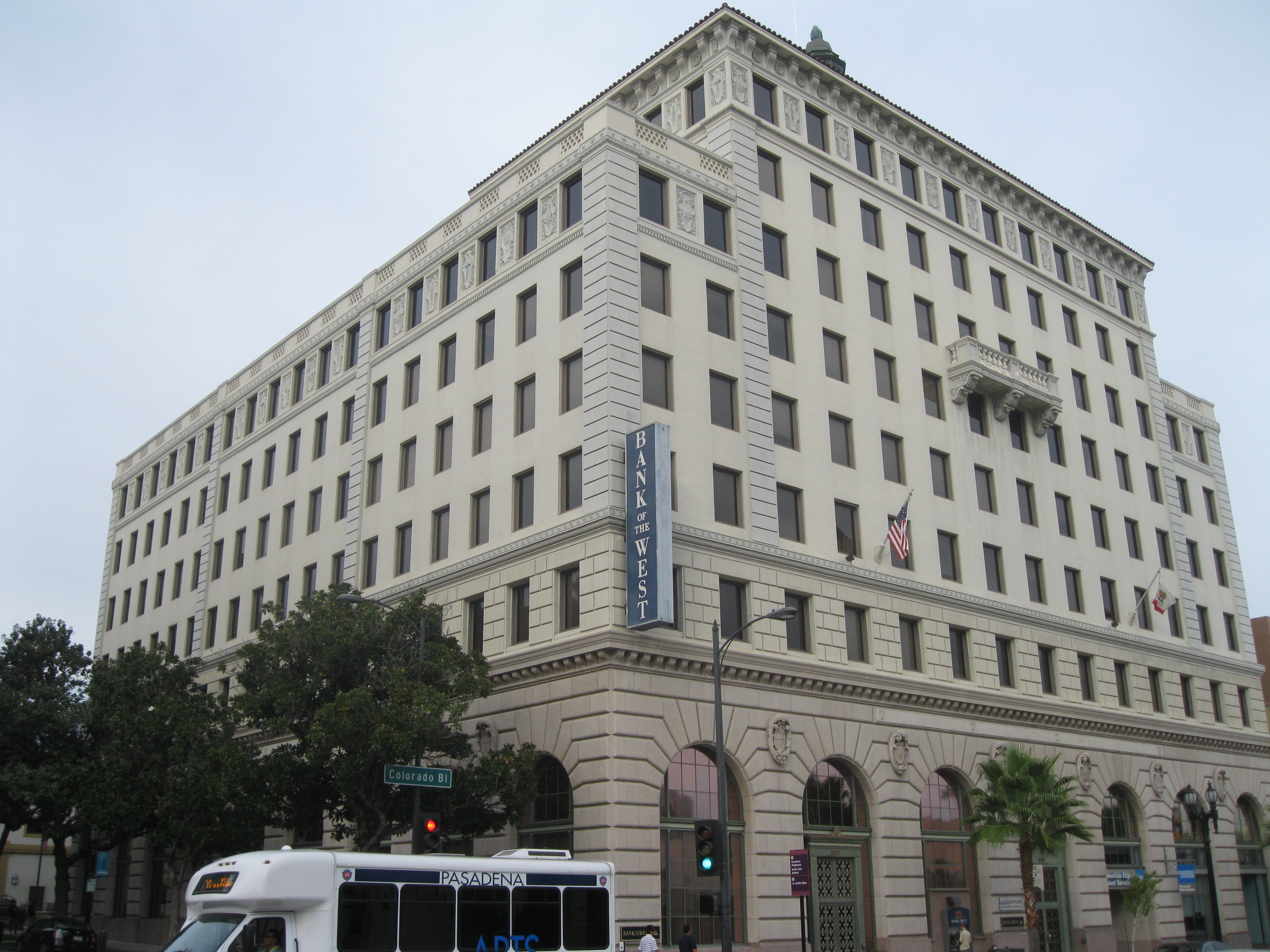
- The First Trust Building in 2013

- Location within the Los Angeles metropolitan area Location within California Location within the United States
- Location: 587--611 E. Colorado Blvd. and 30-44 N. Madison Ave., Pasadena, California
- Coordinates: 34°8′46″N 118°8′17″W
- Built: 1927
- Architect: Bennett & Haskell
- Architectural style: Renaissance Revival, Mediterranean Revival,
- NRHP reference No.: 87000941
- Added to NRHP: June 12, 1987

First Trust Building and Garage, also known as Lloyd's Bank, is a historic 1927 building located on Colorado Boulevard in Pasadena, California. The building was designed by Cyril Bennett and Fitch Haskell; its design incorporates the Mediterranean Revival, Renaissance Revival, and Beaux-Arts styles. The design features decorative exterior stonework, a red tile hip roof topped with a cupola, and a frieze and balustrade on the south facade. The building's interior is decorated with murals depicting scenes from around Pasadena. Caltech professor R. R. Martel designed the building's earthquake-proof support system, which uses steel beams and girders with reinforcing concrete; the system was considered an important advancement in earthquake-proof construction and became a standard form of construction.

The First Trust Building and Garage was listed on the National Register of Historic Places in 1987.
