= The Summerlad =

Canadian musical group

- Origin: Calgary, Alberta, Canada
- Genres: Alternative rock
- Years active: 1999–present
- Labels: Saved By Radio, Catch And Release
- Past members: Garrett McClure; Arran Fisher; Sean Grier; Dean Martin; Liz Collins

The Summerlad were a band from Calgary, Alberta, Canada, formed by singer-guitarist Garrett McClure in 1999 after the demise of The Primrods. McClure was joined by guitarist Sean Grier, bassist Arran Fisher, and drummer Dean Martin. Their first album, 2001's Distance Will Be Swept Up, was released on Calgary's Catch and Release label, and received coverage in publications like exclaim!. Between 2001 and 2005, they released two singles projects, Mandarin Hand and The Golden Hammers Project. The song "Golden Hammers", which had been remixed by artists such as Jace Lasek of The Besnard Lakes in The Golden Hammers Project, reappeared on The Summerlad's second full-length album, Themes: International, released in 2005 on Saved By Radio. Themes:International received significant airplay on Canadian campus radio stations, and The Summerlad appeared at festivals such as North by Northeast in support of the album.

In 2005, The Summerlad also debuted their epic ensemble piece City of Noise, a depiction of a day in the life of an unspecified city, at One Yellow Rabbit's High Performance Rodeo festival; the piece featured 20 performers in addition to the core quartet. City of Noise was released on CD and double vinyl LP in 2007 on Saved By Radio/Saved By Vinyl. Around this time, guitarist Sean Grier left the band, while keyboardist Liz Collins joined.

== Discography ==
=== Albums ===
- Distance Will Be Swept Up (1999)
- Themes: International (2005)
- City of Noise (double album) (2007)
- Blue Skinned (2010)

=== Singles ===
- "Mandarin Hand"
- "The Golden Hammers Project" (2003)
- "Carnus Magi" / "Everyone Scolds The Wolf" (2006)
