= Campen Lighthouse =

Lighthouse in Lower Saxony, Germany

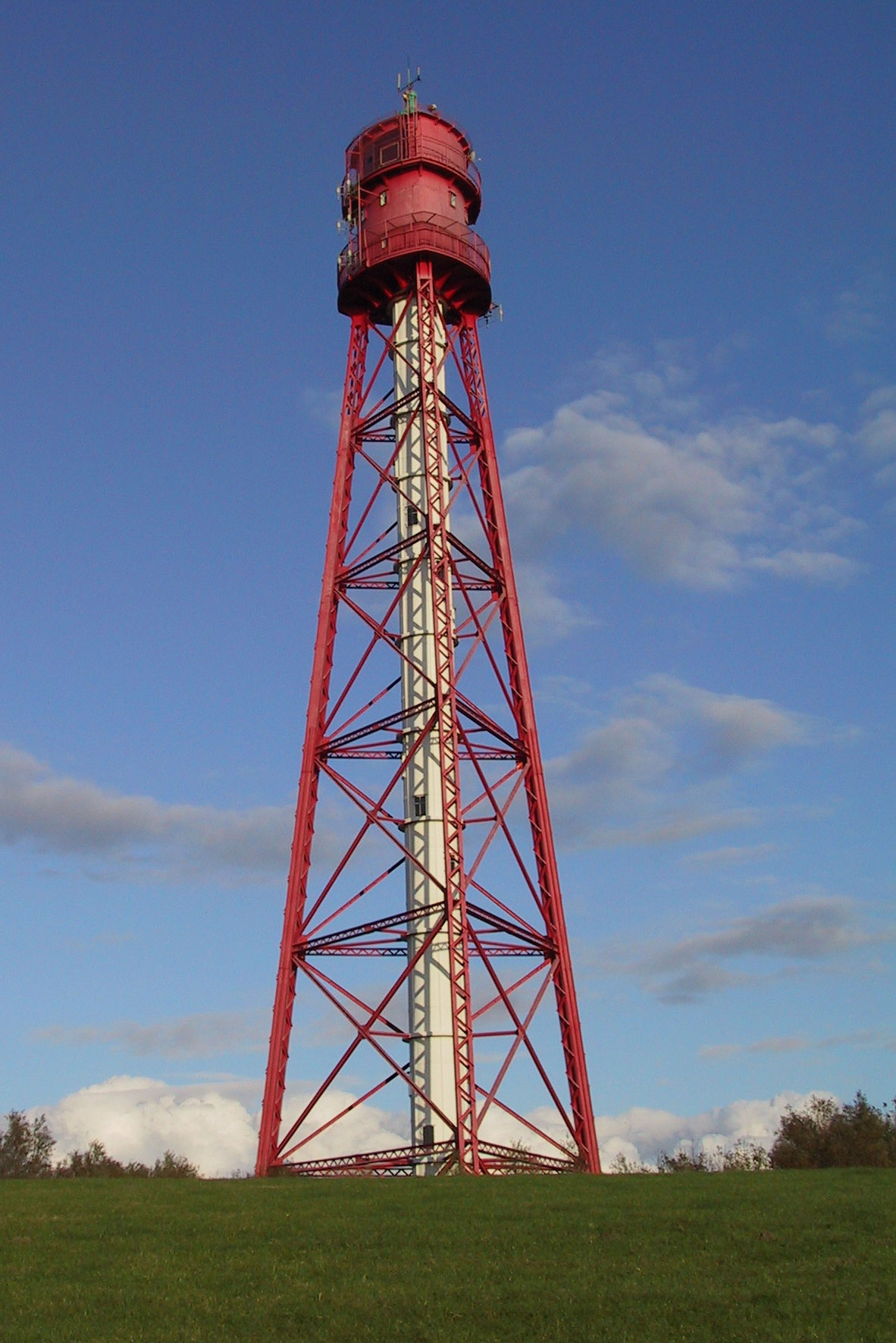
- The lighthouse in 2007
- Location: Campen, Germany
- Coordinates: 53°24′20.7″N 7°0′56.5″E

Tower
- Constructed: 1891
- Construction: steel lattice
- Height: 213 feet (65 m)
- Shape: pyramidal skeletal tower with central white cylinder, double balcony and lantern
- Markings: red skeletal tower, white central cylinder, red lantern
- Heritage: architectural heritage monument in Lower Saxony

Light
- Focal height: 203 feet (62 m)
- Intensity: 4,500,000 cd
- Range: 30 nautical miles (56 km; 35 mi)
- Characteristic: continuous white light along the channel line white flash every 5s narrow right four white flashes every 15s narrow left

Campen Lighthouse is an active lighthouse in the village of Campen, by the Ems estuary, northwest of Emden, in the East Frisia region, state of Lower Saxony, Germany. At a height of 213 feet (65 m) it is the fourteenth tallest "traditional lighthouse" in the world and the tallest in Germany.

The structure consists of a free-standing lattice tower with the stair shaft inside. The lighthouse was built in 1889 and went in service on 1 October 1891.

The lamp of Campen Lighthouse has a light intensity of 4.5 million candelas, the most powerful lighthouse lamp in Germany. Remarkably, the aperture of its flashing light to the left and right has an angle of only 0.3 degrees. The continuous light aperture is also quite small, less than 0.6 degrees. The lighthouse has a range of 30 nautical miles, or 56 kilometers.

The machine building contains the oldest workable diesel engine in Germany. It was built in 1906 and has a power of 15 kilowatts.

== See also ==
- List of tallest lighthouses in the world
- List of lighthouses and lightvessels in Germany
