= Cellular noise =

Random variability in quantities arising in cellular biology

Cellular noise is random variability in quantities arising in cellular biology. For example, cells which are genetically identical, even within the same tissue, are often observed to have different expression levels of proteins, different sizes and structures. These apparently random differences can have important biological and medical consequences.

Cellular noise was originally, and is still often, examined in the context of gene expression levels – either the concentration or copy number of the products of genes within and between cells. As gene expression levels are responsible for many fundamental properties in cellular biology, including cells' physical appearance, behaviour in response to stimuli, and ability to process information and control internal processes, the presence of noise in gene expression has profound implications for many processes in cellular biology.

== Definitions ==
The most frequent quantitative definition of noise is the coefficient of variation:

$$\eta_X = \frac{\sigma_X}{\mu_X},$$

where $\eta_X$ is the noise in a quantity $X$, $\mu_X$ is the mean value of $X$ and $\sigma_X$ is the standard deviation of $X$. This measure is dimensionless, allowing a relative comparison of the importance of noise, without necessitating knowledge of the absolute mean.

Other quantities often used for mathematical convenience are the Fano factor:

$$F_X = \frac{\sigma_X^2}{\mu_X}.$$

and the normalized variance:

$$N_X = \eta_X^2 = \frac{\sigma_X^2}{\mu_X^2}.$$

== Experimental measurement ==
The first experimental account and analysis of gene expression noise in prokaryotes is from Becskei & Serrano and from Alexander van Oudenaarden's lab. The first experimental account and analysis of gene expression noise in eukaryotes is from James J. Collins's lab.

== Intrinsic and extrinsic noise ==
A schematic illustration of a dual reporter study. Each data point corresponds to a measurement of the expression level of two identically regulated genes in a single cell: the scatter reflects measurements of a population of cells. Extrinsic noise is characterised by expression levels of both genes covarying between cells, intrinsic by internal differences.

Cellular noise is often investigated in the framework of intrinsic and extrinsic noise. Intrinsic noise refers to variation in identically regulated quantities within a single cell: for example, the intra-cell variation in expression levels of two identically controlled genes. Extrinsic noise refers to variation in identically regulated quantities between different cells: for example, the cell-to-cell variation in expression of a given gene.

Intrinsic and extrinsic noise levels are often compared in dual reporter studies, in which the expression levels of two identically regulated genes (often fluorescent reporters like GFP and YFP) are plotted for each cell in a population.

An issue with the general depiction of extrinsic noise as a spread along the main diagonal in dual-reporter studies is the assumption that extrinsic factors cause positive expression correlations between the two reporters. In fact, when the two reporters compete for binding of a low-copy regulator, the two reporters become anomalously anticorrelated, and the spread is perpendicular to the main diagonal. In fact, any deviation of the dual-reporter scatter plot from circular symmetry indicates extrinsic noise. Information theory offers a way to avoid this anomaly.

== Sources ==
Note: These lists are illustrative, not exhaustive, and identification of noise sources is an active and expanding area of research.

Intrinsic noise

- Low copy-number effects (including discrete birth and death events): the random (stochastic) nature of production and degradation of cellular components means that noise is high for components at low copy number (as the magnitude of these random fluctuations is not negligible with respect to the copy number);
- Diffusive cellular dynamics: many important cellular processes rely on collisions between reactants (for example, RNA polymerase and DNA) and other physical criteria which, given the diffusive dynamic nature of the cell, occur stochastically.
- Noise propagation: Low copy-number effects and diffusive dynamics result in each of the biochemical reactions in a cell occurring randomly. Stochasticity of reactions can be either attenuated or amplified. Contribution each reaction makes to the intrinsic variability in copy numbers can be quantified via Van Kampen's system size expansion.

Extrinsic noise

- Cellular age / cell cycle stage: cells in a dividing population that is not synchronised will, at a given snapshot in time, be at different cell cycle stages, with corresponding biochemical and physical differences;
- Cell growth: variations in growth rates leading to concentration variations between cells;
- Physical environment (temperature, pressure, ...): physical quantities and chemical concentrations (particularly in the case of cell-to-cell signalling) may vary spatially across a population of cells, provoking extrinsic differences as a function of position;
- Organelle distributions: random factors in the quantity and quality of organelles (for example, the number and functionality of mitochondria) lead to significant cell-to-cell differences in a range of processes (as, for example, mitochondria play a central role in the energy budget of eukaryotic cells);
- Inheritance noise: uneven partitioning of cellular components between daughter cells at mitosis can result in large extrinsic differences in a dividing population.
- Regulator competition: Regulators competing to bind downstream promoters can cause negative correlations: when one promoter is bound the other is not and vice versa.

Note that extrinsic noise can affect levels and types of intrinsic noise: for example, extrinsic differences in the mitochondrial content of cells lead, through differences in ATP levels, to some cells transcribing faster than others, affecting the rates of gene expression and the magnitude of intrinsic noise across the population.

== Effects ==
Note: These lists are illustrative, not exhaustive, and identification of noise effects is an active and expanding area of research.

- Gene expression levels: noise in gene expression causes differences in the fundamental properties of cells, limits their ability to biochemically control cellular dynamics, and directly or indirectly induce many of the specific effects below;
- Energy levels and transcription rate: noise in transcription rate, arising from sources including transcriptional bursting, is a significant source of noise in expression levels of genes. Extrinsic noise in mitochondrial content has been suggested to propagate to differences in the ATP concentrations and transcription rates (with functional relationships implied between these three quantities) in cells, affecting cells' energetic competence and ability to express genes;
- Phenotype selection: bacterial populations exploit extrinsic noise to choose a population subset to enter a quiescent state. In a bacterial infection, for example, this subset will not propagate quickly but will be more robust when the population is threatened by antibiotic treatment: the rapidly replicating, infectious bacteria will be killed more quickly than the quiescent subset, which may be capable of restarting the infection. This phenomenon is why courses of antibiotics should not be finished even when symptoms seem to have disappeared;
- Development and stem cell differentiation: developmental noise in biochemical processes which need to be tightly controlled (for example, patterning of gene expression levels that develop into different body parts) during organismal development can have dramatic consequences, necessitating the evolution of robust cellular machinery. Stem cells differentiate into different cell types depending on the expression levels of various characteristic genes: noise in gene expression can clearly perturb and influence this process, and noise in transcription rate can affect the structure of the dynamic landscape that differentiation occurs on. There are review articles summarizing these effects from bacteria to mammalian cells;
- Drug resistance: Noise improves short-term survival and long-term evolution of drug resistance at high levels of drug treatment. Noise has the opposite effect at low levels of drug treatment;
- Cancer treatments: recent work has found extrinsic differences, linked to gene expression levels, in the response of cancer cells to anti-cancer treatments, potentially linking the phenomenon of fractional killing (whereby each treatment kills some but not all of a tumour) to noise in gene expression. Because individual cells could repeatedly and stochastically perform transitions between states associated with differences in responsiveness to a therapeutic modality (chemotherapy, targeted agent, radiation, etc.), therapy might need to be administered frequently (to ensure cells are treated soon after entering a therapy-responsive state, before they can rejoin the therapy-resistant subpopulation and proliferate) and over long times (to treat even those cells emerging late from the final residue of the therapy-resistant subpopulation).
- Evolution of genome: Genome are covered by chromatin that can be roughly classified into "open" (also known as euchromatin) or "closed" (also known as heterochromatin). Open chromatin leads to less noise in transcription compared to heterochromatin. Often "housekeeping" proteins (which are proteins that carry out tasks in the required for cellular survival) work large multiprotein complexes. If the noise in proteins of such complexes are to discoordinated, it can lead to reduced level of production of multiprotein complexes, with potentially deleterious effects. Reduction in noise may provide an evolutionary selection movement of essential genes into open chromatin.
- Information processing: as cellular regulation is performed with components that are themselves subject to noise, the ability of cells to process information and perform control is fundamentally limited by intrinsic noise

== Analysis ==
A canonical model for stochastic gene expression, known as the two-state or telegraph model. DNA flips between "inactive" and "active" states (involving, for example, chromatin remodelling and transcription factor binding). Active DNA is transcribed to produce mRNA which is translated to produce protein, both of which are degraded. All processes are Poissonian with given rates.

As many quantities of cell biological interest are present in discrete copy number within the cell (single DNAs, dozens of mRNAs, hundreds of proteins), tools from discrete stochastic mathematics are often used to analyse and model cellular noise. In particular, master equation treatments – where the probabilities $P(\mathbf{x},t)$ of observing a system in a state $\mathbf{x}$ at time $t$ are linked through ODEs – have proved particularly fruitful. A canonical model for noise gene expression, where the processes of DNA activation, transcription and translation are all represented as Poisson processes with given rates, gives a master equation which may be solved exactly (with generating functions) under various assumptions or approximated with stochastic tools like Van Kampen's system size expansion.

Numerically, the Gillespie algorithm or stochastic simulation algorithm is often used to create realisations of stochastic cellular processes, from which statistics can be calculated.

The problem of inferring the values of parameters in stochastic models (parametric inference) for biological processes, which are typically characterised by sparse and noisy experimental data, is an active field of research, with methods including Bayesian MCMC and approximate Bayesian computation proving adaptable and robust. Regarding the two-state model, a moment-based method was described for parameters inference from mRNAs distributions.
