= Bible Land =

Defunct roadside attraction in California

- Location within southern California
- 34.0145°N 117.0814°W
- Location: Yucaipa, California (formerly Temecula, California)

History
- Founded: 1960s
- Demolished: 1994

Site notes
- Sculptor: Ted Conibear

Bible Land was a free roadside attraction, originally located in Temecula, California, and later moved to Yucaipa, California along Interstate 10. Built in Temecula during the late 1950s by sand sculptor Ted Conibear, the attraction featured sand sculptures of various scenes primarily of the New Testament, including a life-sized rendition of the Last Supper. The Last Supper scene was covered by a cavelike structure, likely to both protect the delicate sand sculpture from weather and also to recreate the indoor environment of the original painting.

== History ==
Conibear, who traveled the American Southwest as an itinerant artist and sand sculptor. He made his first religious sculpture in 1939 and eventually became a Christian due to having to look up disciples in The Bible. Bible Land was constructed around 1958. Bible Land was the last of Conibear's sand sculptures to remain standing due to the land having security paid for by voluntary donations, whereas others often fell victim to vandalism.

Conibear maintained the attraction until his death in 1994. His son, Don Conibear, attempted to keep the landmark intact but found it unfeasible for various reasons. The sculptures had been badly eroded by wind and insects, and Conibear felt that any type of restoration effort would in-authenticate the work of his father. Conibear also looked for someone new to maintain the sculptures and investors to keep the site running but did not find either. It was believed that Ted Conibear had told his son Don to destroy the sculptures so that they would not fall victim to vandalism or that his son did it because he was an atheist. Don reportedly debunked the rumors online in 2011 by stating he was a Christian and that it was only due to maintenance resulting in the sculptures no longer being his father's work that they were allowed to deteriorate away.
