= Kreis Kempen =

Kreis Kempen may refer to:

- Kempen (district), a district of the Prussian region of Kleve from 1816–1929
- Kempen-Krefeld, a district of Rhenish Prussia and North Rhine-Westphalia from 1929–1975; see Krefeld
- Kempen (Wartheland), a district of Prussian Posen from 1887–1920
