= Campen, Germany =

Village in Lower Saxony, Germany

Campen
- Village of Krummhörn
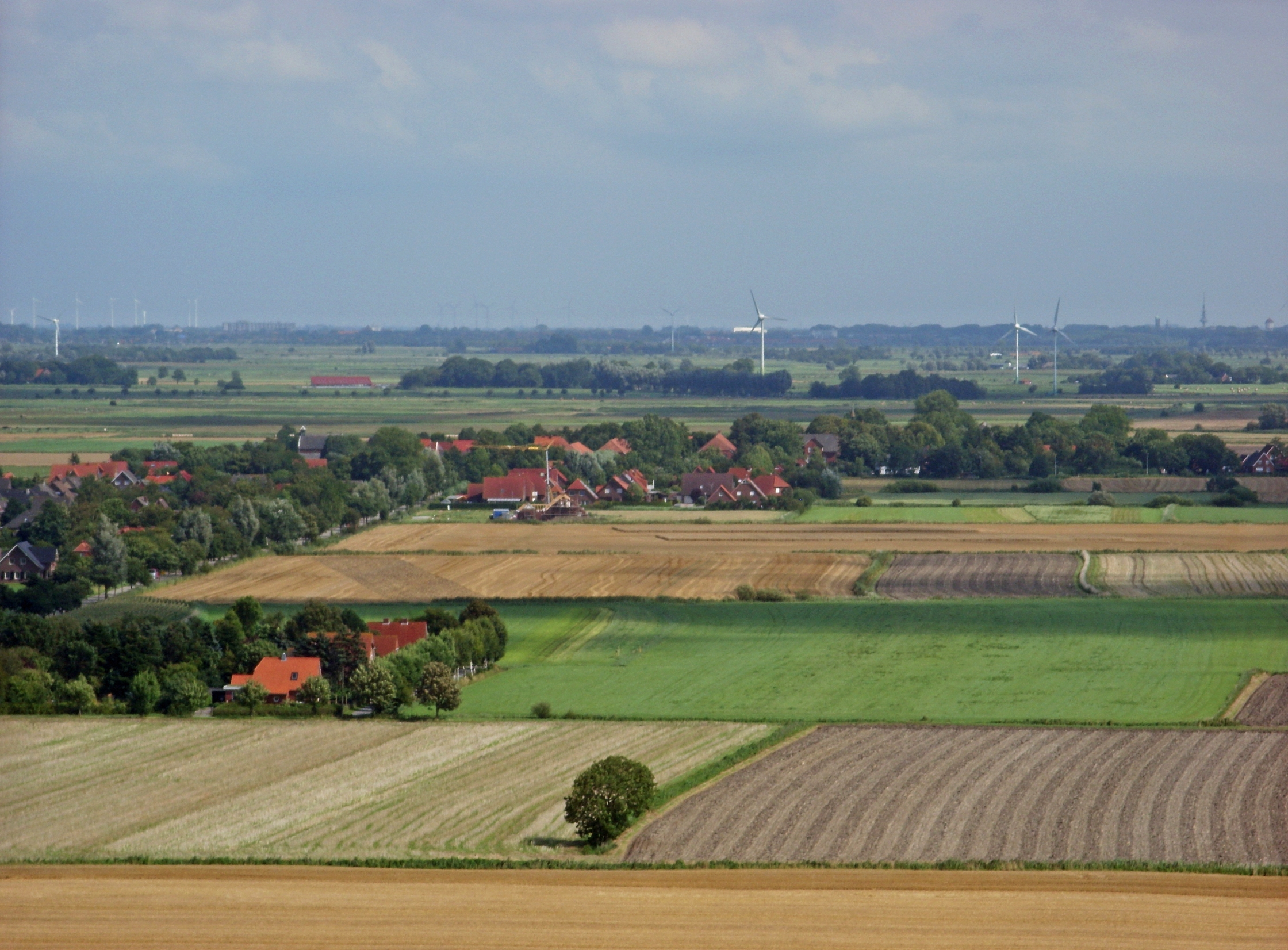
- Campen as seen from the Campen lighthouse

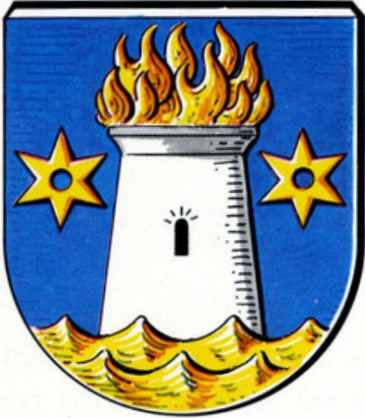
- Coat of arms
- Interactive map of Campen
- Location within Germany Location within Lower Saxony
- Country: Germany
- State: Lower Saxony
- District: Aurich
- Municipality: Krummhörn

Area
  - Metro: 6.06 km^{2} (2.34 sq mi)
- Elevation: 1 m (3.3 ft)

Population
  - Metro: 475
- Time zone: UTC+01:00 (CET)
  - Summer (DST): UTC+02:00 (CEST)
- Postal codes: 26736
- Dialling codes: 04927

Campen is a village in the region of East Frisia, in Lower Saxony, Germany. It is part of the municipality of Krummhörn.

Although Campen is only a small village, it still has two churches: the Reformed village church from the thirteenth century and the Old-Reformed church from 1905. Near the village is the Campen lighthouse. It was built in 1889 and has been in use since 1891. It is 65.3 meters high, making it the tallest lighthouse in Germany.

The village of Campen was first attested as Campe maiori in the 10th century.

== Gallery ==
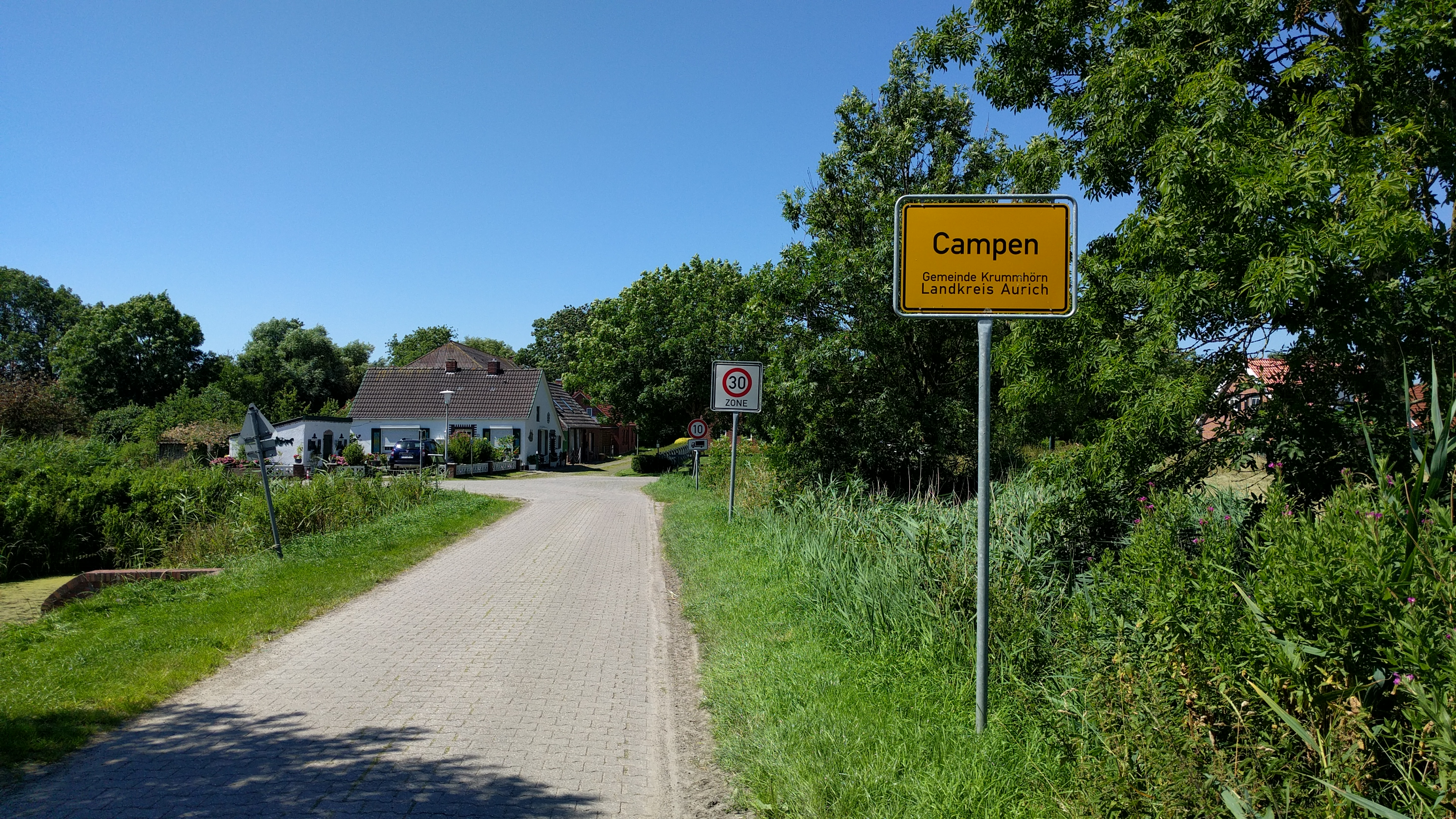
Entrance to Campen

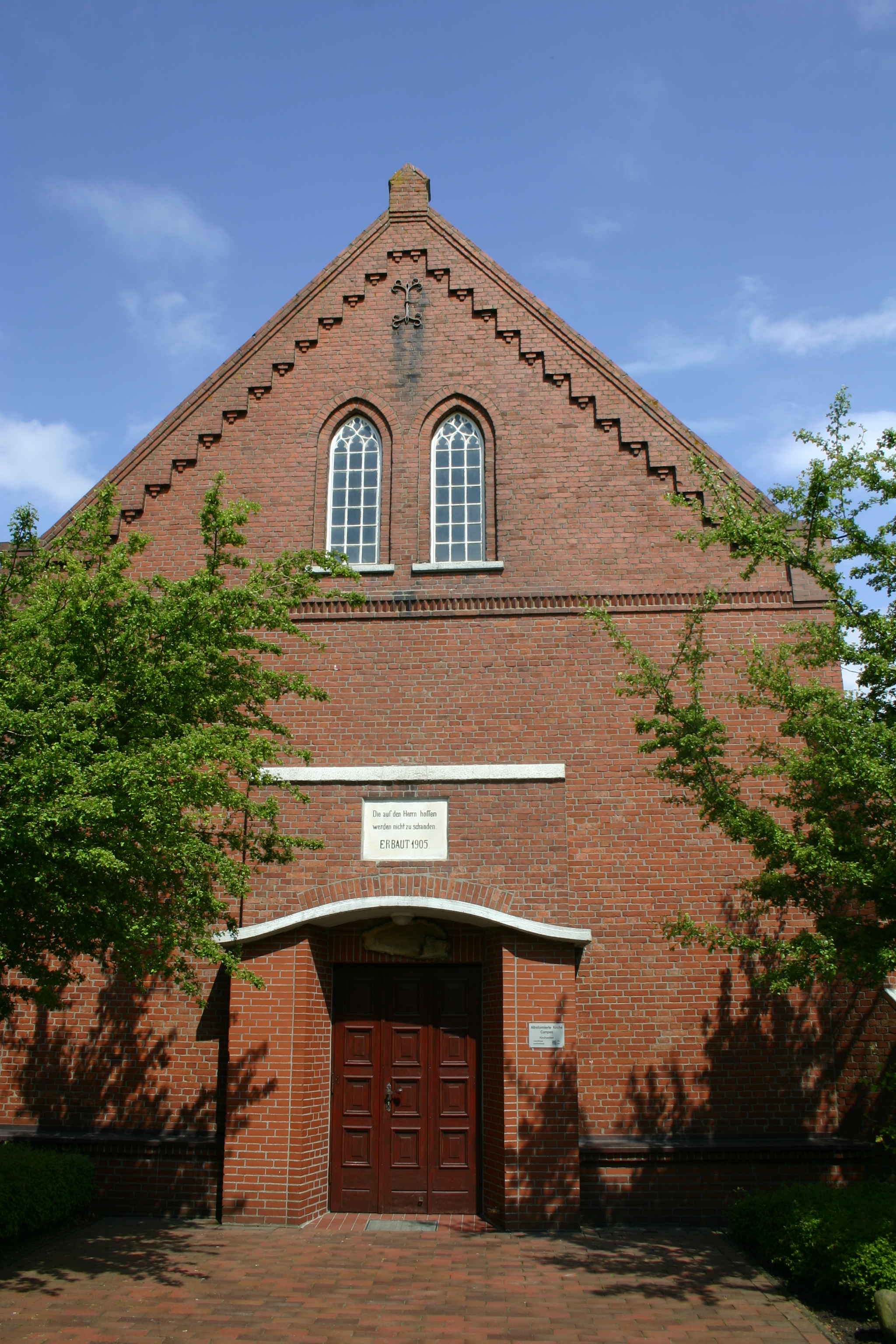
Old-Reformed Church of Campen

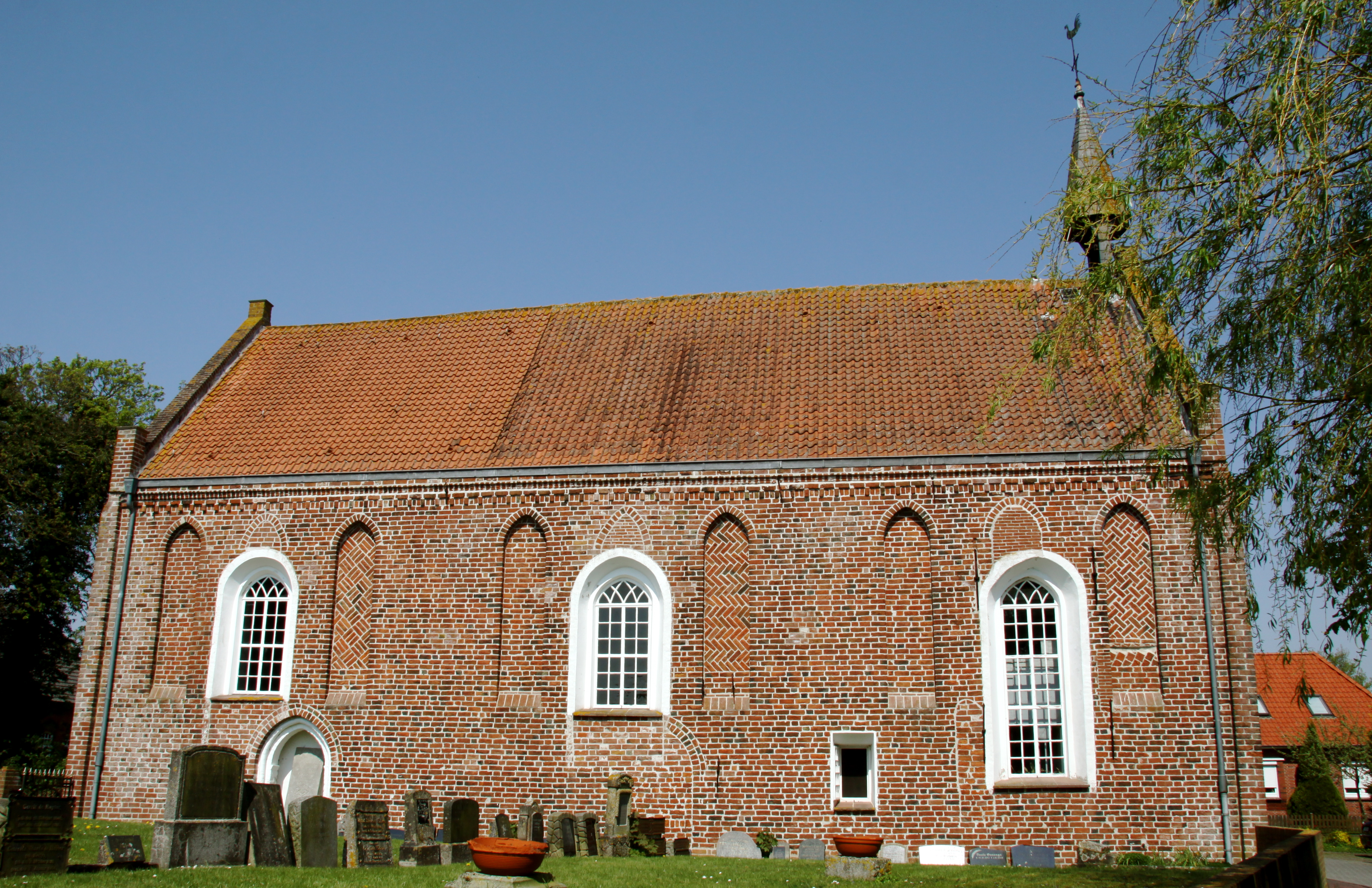
Reformed Church of Campen

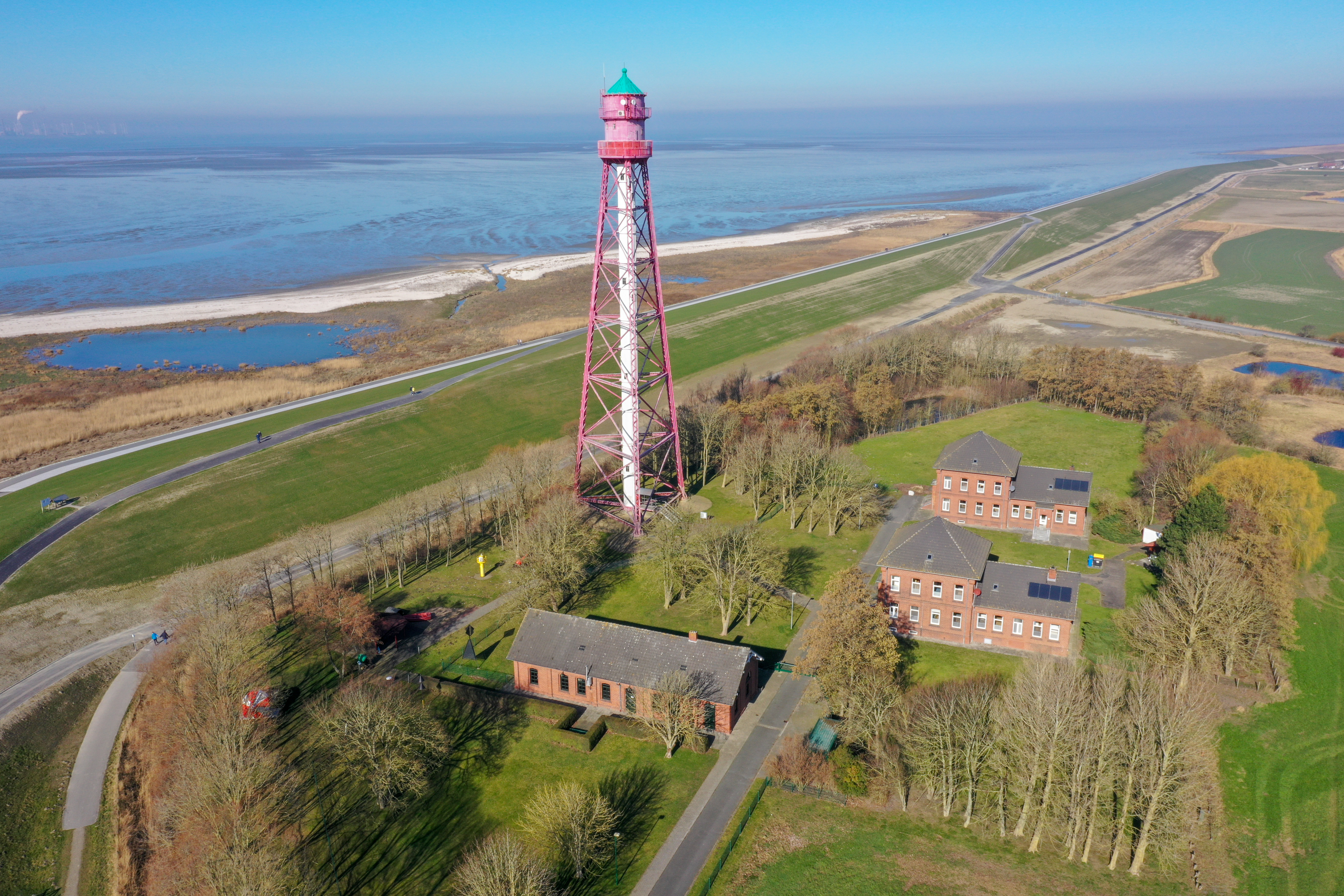
Campen lighthouse
