= Van Campen =

Van Campen is a Dutch and German surname, and may refer to:

- Cretien van Campen (born 1963), Dutch author
- Jacob van Campen (1596–1657), Dutch architect
  - Schouwburg of Van Campen, theatre built by Jacob
- John van Campen (died 1583), German scholar of Hebrew
- Moses Van Campen (1757–1849), soldier of the American Revolutionary War
- Van Campen's Inn, a historic 1746 stonehouse located in Walpack Township, New Jersey the Delaware Water Gap National Recreation Area
