= Van Kampen Investments =

Former independent American mutual fund company

Van Kampen Investments, Inc. (also Van Kampen Funds, Inc. or Van Kampen American Capital) was an American mutual fund company. Formerly independent, it was acquired by Morgan Stanley in 1996. Most of Morgan Stanley's asset management activities were principally conducted under the Morgan Stanley and Van Kampen brands.

On October 19, 2009, Morgan Stanley announced that Van Kampen would be sold to Invesco for $1.5 billion. After the acquisition, Invesco ceased using the Van Kampen name.

== History ==
The company was established in 1974 by Robert Van Kampen in Chicago. He developed a niche bond product when he pioneered insurance coverage for tax-exempt bond funds. After New York City's near-default in 1975, investors flocked to Van Kampen's insured unit investment trusts. In 1982, the company broke records in the industry by introducing a $125 million Insured Municipal Income Trust (IMIT), soon followed by an even larger $128.5 IMIT. By 1983, the company now known as Van Kampen Merritt, Inc. had sold nearly $7 billion of trusts and was the nation's third-largest firm in that arena.

In 1984, Van Kampen sold the firm to Xerox Corporation for about $200 million. However, after eight years, in 1992 Xerox decided to shed all its financial-services units starting with Van Kampen. Xerox had initially planned to offer stock in Van Kampen to the public. However the investment firm Clayton, Dubilier & Rice made a better offer and bought 80% of Van Kampen from Xerox for approx $360 million. The remaining shares were held by Xerox and staff of the firm.

In 1996, Morgan Stanley bought Van Kampen American Capital Inc from Clayton for $745 million to help it build its money management business. Morgan Stanley merged the business with its own money management business but continued to use the Van Kampen name.

In 2009, Morgan Stanley announced that Van Kampen would be sold to Invesco for $1.5 billion. Invesco later dissolved the Van Kampen funds' boards of directors, and eliminated the use of the Van Kampen name in funds in July 2012.
