= Tierra Santa (theme park) =

Amusement park in Argentina

Coordinates: 34°32′50″S 58°25′57″W

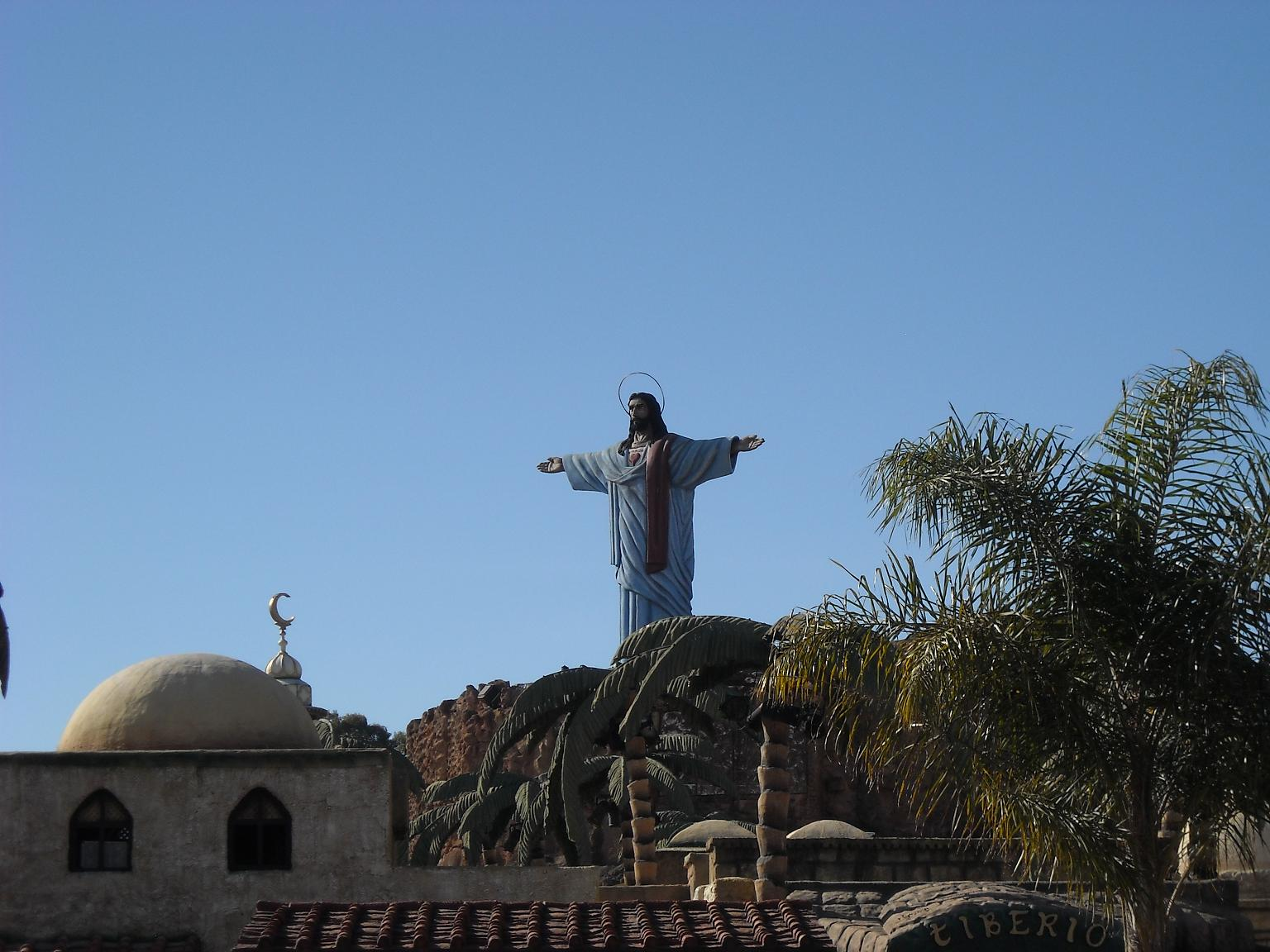
Tierra Santa, theme park

Tierra Santa (Spanish: Holy Land) is a religious theme park in Buenos Aires, Argentina.

== Description ==
Tierra Santa is a large reproduction where visitors can walk the streets of Biblical Jerusalem, living step by step scenes from the life of Jesus as described in the Bible. Cultures represented include Christians, Jews, and Romans. A 18 metres (59 ft) Jesus rises from behind a rock every hour, on the hour, a solemn religious experience for many visitors, but also provoking derision on the Internet as kitschy. The park also includes statues of several 20th-century historical figures such as Pope John Paul II and Mother Teresa, according to park staff were included because they were historic figures who "fought for peace" and that the park also wanted to also pay tribute to them.

== Gallery ==
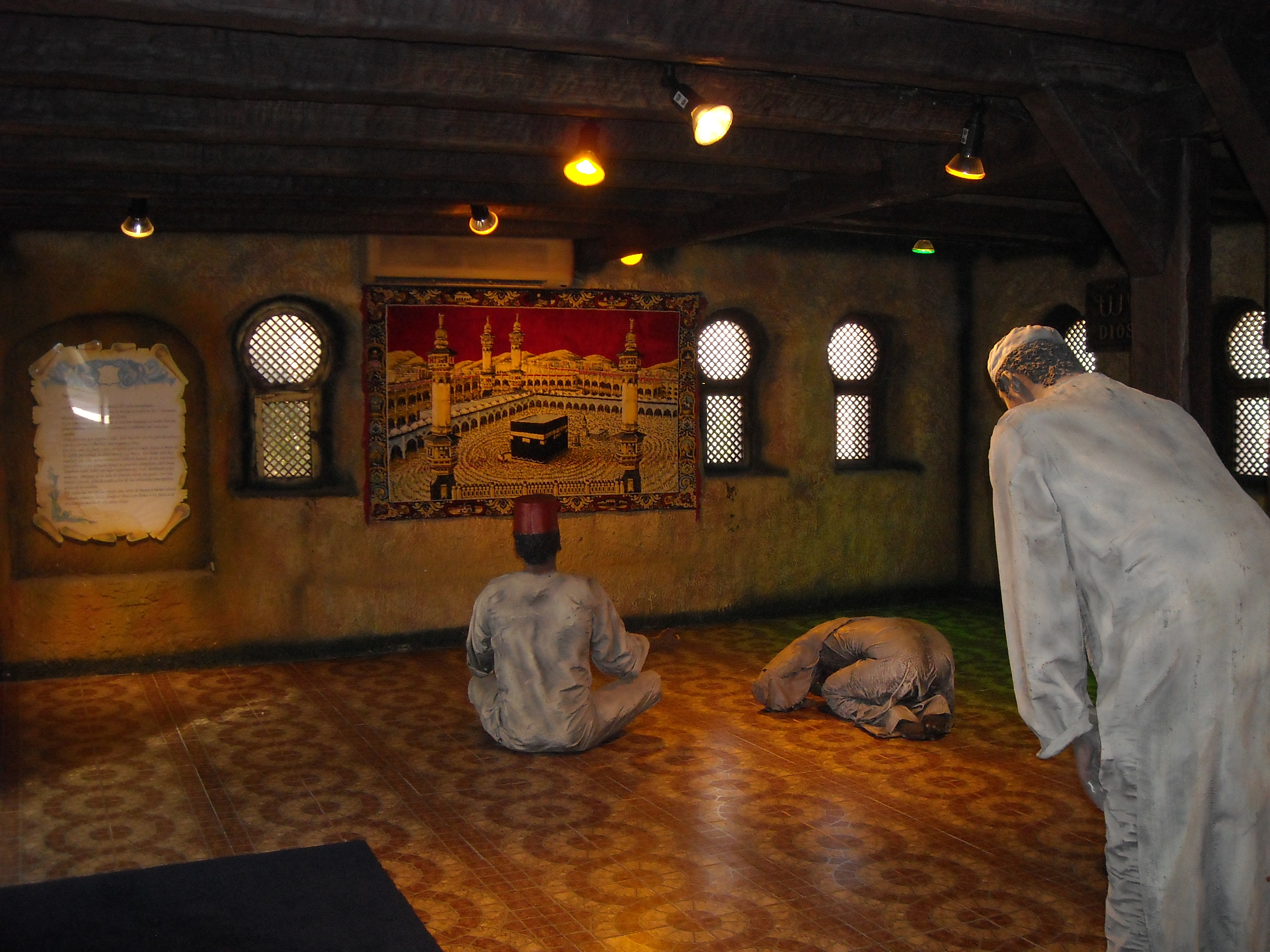
Mosque

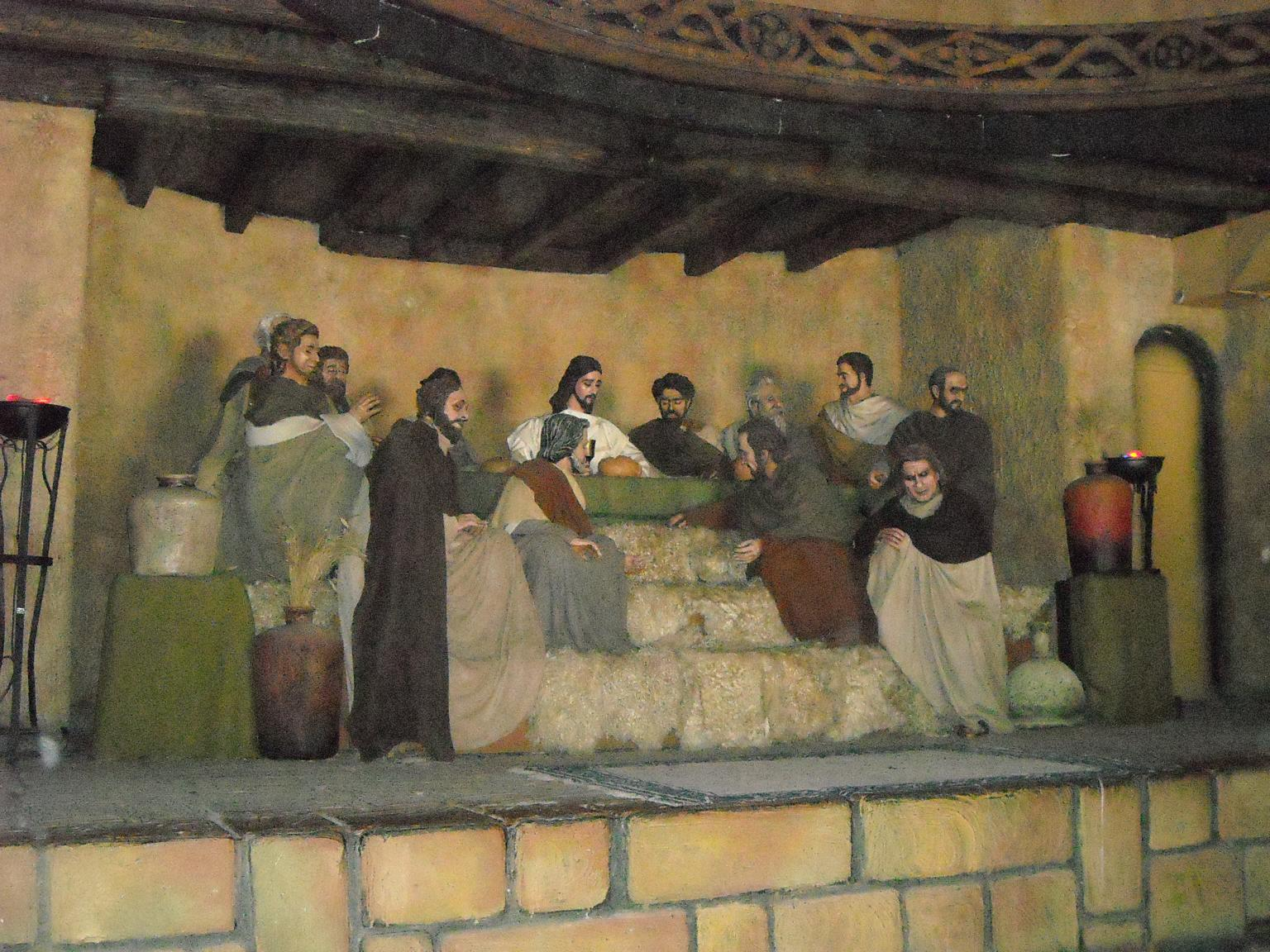
Last Supper

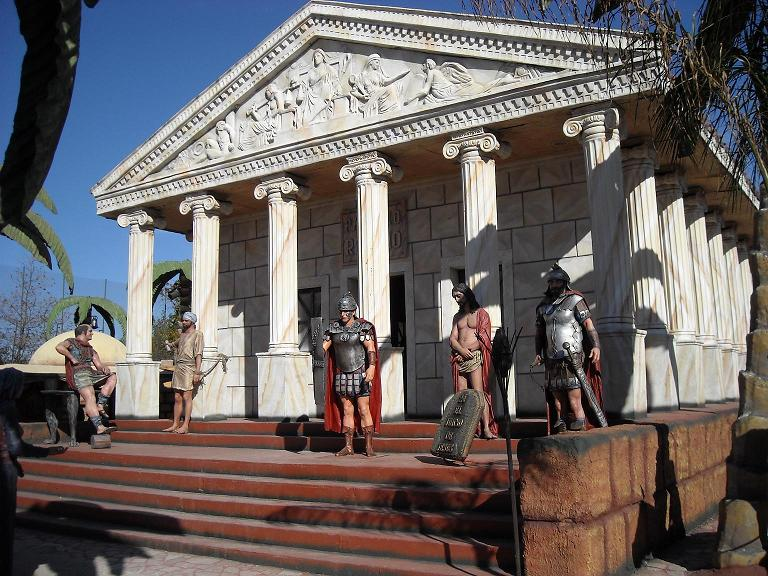
Trial of Jesus

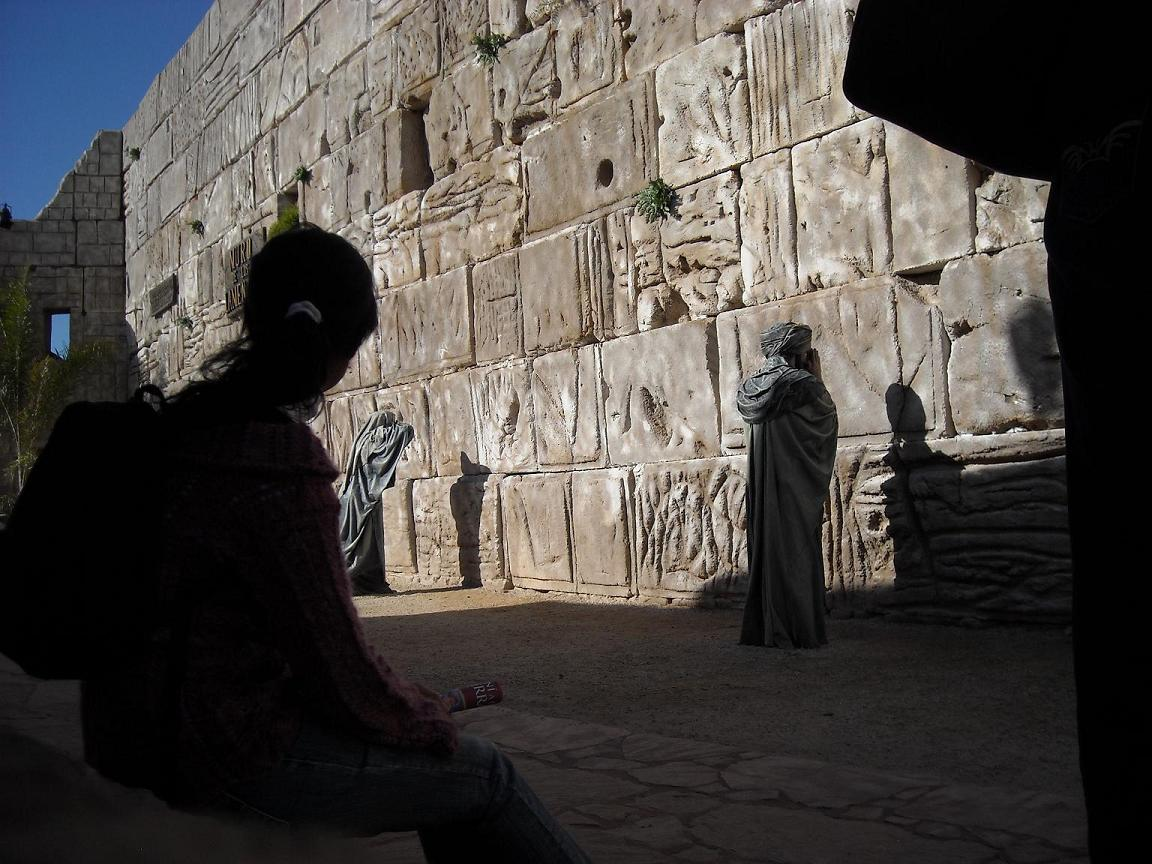
Wailing Wall
