= Nico van Kampen =

Dutch theoretical physicist (1921–2013)

- Born: Nicolaas Godfried van Kampen; 22 June 1921; Leiden, Netherlands
- Died: 6 October 2013 (aged 92); Nieuwegein, Netherlands
- Education: Leiden University
- Known for: Van Kampen expansion Van Kampen modes
- Scientific career
- Fields: Theoretical physics
- Workplaces: Utrecht University
- Thesis: Contributions to the quantum theory of light scattering
- Doctoral advisor: Hendrik Anthony Kramers

Nicolaas 'Nico' Godfried van Kampen (22 June 1921 – 6 October 2013) was a Dutch theoretical physicist, who worked mainly on statistical mechanics and non-equilibrium thermodynamics.

Van Kampen was born in Leiden, and was a nephew of Frits Zernike. He studied physics at Leiden University, where in 1952 under the direction of Hendrik Anthony Kramers he earned his PhD with thesis Contributions to the quantum theory of light scattering. He showed in his thesis how to deal with singularities in quantum mechanical scattering processes, an important step in the development of renormalization, according to Kramers. Van Kampen made fundamental contributions to non-equilibrium processes (in particular on the master equation) and in many-body theory (especially in plasma physics). His work on non-equilibrium processes began in 1953 in the research group of Sybren Ruurds de Groot (the successor to Kramers) in Leiden. In 1955 Van Kampen joined the Institute of Theoretical Physics at Utrecht University, where he later became full professor and professor emeritus after his retirement.

His monograph Stochastic processes in physics and chemistry (1981) is considered a classic. In his 2002 book Waanwetenschap (Science), Van Kampen condemned what he saw as pseudoscience, even within the scientific community; the book met with a mixed reaction—five scientists, including Vincent Icke, Floris Takens and Dennis Dieks, wrote a commentary on his book. Van Kampen had 15 Dutch-type PhD students, including Ubbo Felderhof (1963), John Tjon (1964) and Johannes Roerdink (1983).

Van Kampen was an uncle of the Dutch theoretical physicist and Nobel prize winner Gerard 't Hooft, and encouraged 't Hooft to study physics in Utrecht. Van Kampen was a member of the Royal Netherlands Academy of Arts and Sciences since 1973. He died, aged 92, in Nieuwegein.

== Quantum mechanics ==
Van Kampen was a severe critic of non-orthodox interpretations of quantum mechanics. Some of his views on this subject were published in his article "The scandal of quantum mechanics". He disclosed his own approach to quantum mechanics in his paper "Ten theorems about quantum mechanical measurements".

== Additional works ==
- with B. U. Felderhof: Theoretical methods in plasma physics, North Holland 1967, LCCN 67-20023 ISBN 0720401208
- "Entropie" (PDF). Plus Lucis (in German) (3). Universität Wien: 7–8. 1997. Archived from the original (PDF) on 29 December 2014. "Entropie entartet langsam zu einem Modewort"
- Views of a physicist. Selected papers of N. G. van Kampen, World Scientific 2000 (ed. Paul H. E. Meijer) LCCN 2005-297756 ISBN 981-02-4357-X
- Stochastic processes in physics and chemistry, North Holland 1981, 3rd edn., 2007, LCCN 2010-484271 ISBN 0-444-89349-0
- Elimination of fast variables, Amsterdam: North-Holland, 1985. Series: Physics Reports, v. 124, no. 2
