= Field-theoretic simulation =

Statistical mechanics simulation

A field-theoretic simulation is a numerical strategy to calculate structure and physical properties of a many-particle system within the framework of a statistical field theory, like e.g. a polymer field theory. A convenient possibility is to use Monte Carlo (MC) algorithms, to sample the full partition function integral expressed in field-theoretic representation. The procedure is then called the auxiliary field Monte Carlo method. However, it is well known that MC sampling in conjunction with the basic field-theoretic representation of the partition function integral, directly obtained via the Hubbard-Stratonovich transformation, is impracticable, due to the so-called numerical sign problem (Baeurle 2002, Fredrickson 2002). The difficulty is related to the complex and oscillatory nature of the resulting distribution function, which causes a bad statistical convergence of the ensemble averages of the desired structural and thermodynamic quantities. In such cases special analytical and numerical techniques are required to accelerate the statistical convergence of the field-theoretic simulation (Baeurle 2003, Baeurle 2003a, Baeurle 2004).

== Shifted-contour Monte Carlo technique ==
=== Mean field representation ===
To make the field-theoretic methodology amenable for computation, Baeurle proposed to shift the contour of integration of the partition function integral through the homogeneous mean field (MF) solution using Cauchy's integral theorem, which provides its so-called mean-field representation. This strategy was previously successfully employed in field-theoretic electronic structure calculations (Rom 1997, Baer 1998). Baeurle could demonstrate that this technique provides a significant acceleration of the statistical convergence of the ensemble averages in the MC sampling procedure (Baeurle 2002).

=== Gaussian equivalent representation ===
In subsequent works Baeurle et al. (Baeurle 2002, Baeurle 2002a) applied the concept of tadpole renormalization, which originates from quantum field theory and leads to the Gaussian equivalent representation of the partition function integral, in conjunction with advanced MC techniques in the grand canonical ensemble. They could convincingly demonstrate that this strategy provides an additional boost in the statistical convergence of the desired ensemble averages (Baeurle 2002).

== Alternative techniques ==
Other promising field-theoretic simulation techniques have been developed recently, but they either still lack the proof of correct statistical convergence, like e.g. the Complex Langevin method (Ganesan 2001), and/or still need to prove their effectiveness on systems, where multiple saddle points are important (Moreira 2003).
