= Piers Coleman =

British-American physicist

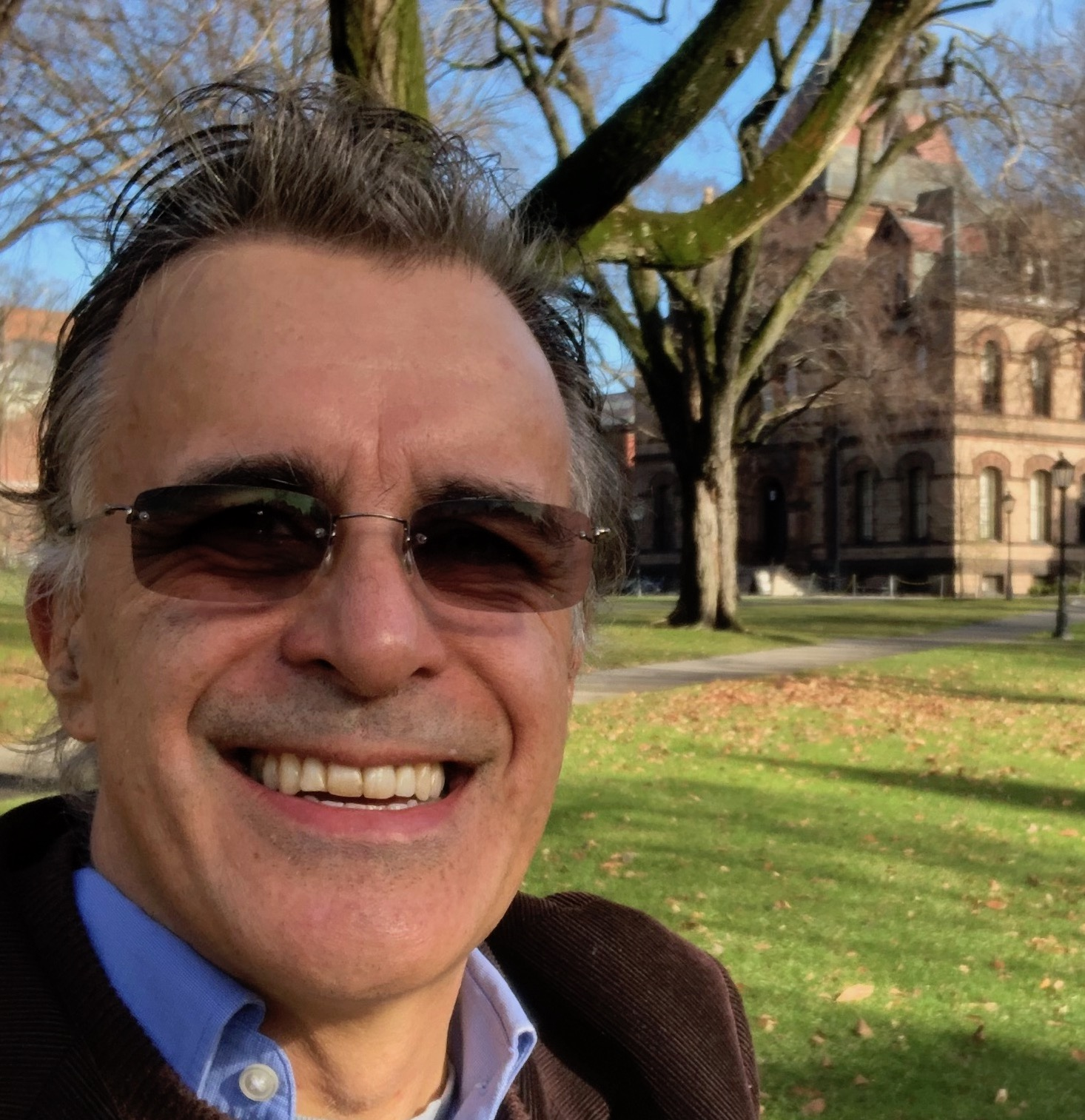
- Coleman in 2018
- Born: 1958 (age 67–68); Cheltenham, England
- Education: Cheltenham Grammar School
- Alma mater: University of Cambridge; Princeton University
- Known for: Slave Boson, quantum criticality, Heavy Fermion superconductivity
- Spouse: Premala Chandra
- Scientific career
- Fields: Condensed matter theory
- Workplaces: Rutgers University; Royal Holloway, University of London
- Doctoral advisor: Philip W. Anderson

Piers Coleman (born 1958) is a British-born theoretical physicist, working in the field of theoretical condensed matter physics. Coleman is professor of physics at Rutgers University in New Jersey and at Royal Holloway, University of London.

== Education and career ==
Coleman was raised in Cheltenham, England, where he attended Cheltenham Grammar School, graduating in 1976. He completed his undergraduate education at Trinity College, Cambridge, pursuing the Natural Sciences Tripos and the Mathematics Tripos part III under the mentorship of Gilbert Lonzarich. In 1980 he won a Jane Eliza Procter Fellowship to Princeton University where he studied theoretical condensed matter physics with Philip Warren Anderson. Contemporaries in the Princeton graduate physics program included Gabriel Kotliar, Cumrun Vafa, Nathan Mhyrvold and Jennifer Chayes. He was awarded a Junior Research Fellowship at Trinity College, Cambridge, which he held from 1983 to 1988. He was a postdoctoral fellow at the Kavli Institute for Theoretical Physics Santa Barbara from 1984 to 1986. He joined the faculty at Rutgers University in 1987. Since 2010 he has also held the position of University of London Chair of Theoretical Condensed Matter Physics at Royal Holloway, University of London. In 2011, Piers Coleman replaced David Pines as a director of the Institute for Complex Adaptive Matter.

== Research ==
Coleman is known for his work related to strongly correlated electron systems, and in particular, the study of magnetism, superconductivity and topological insulators. He is the author of the popular text Introduction to Many-Body Physics.

In his early career at Princeton University Coleman worked on the problem of valence fluctuations in solids. In the 1960s the physicist John Hubbard introduced a mathematical operator, the "Hubbard operator" for describing the restricted fluctuations in valence between two charge states of an ion. In 1983 Coleman invented the slave boson formulation of the Hubbard operators, which involves the factorization of a Hubbard operator into a canonical fermion and a boson $X_{\sigma 0}= f^{\dagger}_{\sigma}b$. The use of canonical fermions enabled the Hubbard operators to be treated within a field-theoretic approach, allowing the first mean-field treatments of the heavy fermion problem. The slave boson approach has since been widely applied to strongly correlated electron systems, and has proven useful in developing the resonating valence bond theory (RVB) of high temperature superconductivity and the understanding of heavy fermion compounds.

At Rutgers, he became interested in the interplay of magnetism with strong electron correlations. With Natan Andrei he adapted the resonating valence bond theory of high temperature superconductivity to heavy fermion superconductivity. In 1990 with Anatoly Larkin and Premi Chandra, they explored the effect of thermal and zero-point magnetic fluctuations on two dimensional frustrated Heisenberg magnets. Conventional wisdom maintained that because of the Mermin–Wagner theorem, two dimensional Heisenberg magnets are unable to develop any form of long-range order. Chandra, Coleman and Larkin demonstrated that frustration can lead to a finite temperature Ising phase transition into a striped state with long range spin-nematic order. This kind of order is now known to develop in high temperature iron-based superconductors.

Working with Alexei Tsvelik, Coleman carried out some of the earliest applications of Majorana Fermions to condensed matter problems. In 1992, Coleman, Miranda and Tsvelik examined the application of the Majorana representation of spins $\vec S = - \tfrac{i}{2} \vec \eta \times \vec \eta$ to the Kondo lattice, showing that if local moments fractionalize as Majorana, rather than Dirac fermions, the resulting ground-state is an odd-frequency superconductor. Working with Andrew Schofield and Alexei Tsvelik, they later advanced a model to account for the unusual magneto-resistance properties of high temperature superconductors in their normal state, in which the electrons fractionalize into Majorana fermions.

In the late 1990s, Coleman became interested in the breakdown of Fermi liquid behavior at a quantum critical point. Working with Gabriel Aeppli and Hilbert von Löhneysen, they demonstrated established the presence of local quantum critical fluctuations in the quantum critical metal CeCu_{6-x}Au_{x}, identified as a consequence of the break-down of the Kondo effect that accompanies the development of magnetism. This led to the prediction that the Fermi surface will change discontinuously at a quantum critical point, a result later observed in field tuned quantum criticality in the material YbRh_{2}Si_{2} and in pressure-tuned quantum criticality in the material CeRhIn_{5}.

After the discovery of topological insulators, Coleman became interested in whether topological insulating behavior could exist in materials with strong correlation. In 2008, the team of Maxim Dzero, Kai Sun and Victor Galitski and Piers Coleman predicted that the class of Kondo insulators can develop a topological ground-state, proposing samarium hexaboride (SmB_{6}) as a Topological Kondo Insulator. The observation of the development of robust conducting surface states in SmB_{6} is consistent with this early prediction.

Notable former research students and postdoctoral fellows in his group include Ian Ritchey, Eduardo Miranda, Andrew Schofield, Maxim Dzero, Andriy Nevidomskyy and Rebecca Flint

== Personal life ==
Piers Coleman is married to the American theoretical physicist Premala Chandra and they have two sons. He is the elder brother of musician and composer Jaz Coleman.

== Science outreach ==
Along with his younger brother Jaz, Coleman worked on a concert and physics outreach website Music of the Quantum. The concert has pieces composed by Jaz Coleman, based on themes from physics such as quantum criticality, emergence and symmetry breaking. They delivered performances of Music of the Quantum at the Bethlehem Chapel in Prague and at Columbia University in New York. He has also produced a short documentary on Emergence with Paul Chaikin, as part of the Annenberg series Physics in the 21st Century.

== Awards and honors ==
Coleman was awarded a Sloan Fellowship in 1988. In 2002 he was elected a Fellow of the American Physical Society "for innovative approaches to the theory of strongly correlated electron systems". In 2018 he was elected to the board of the Aspen Center for Physics. His research is supported by the National Science Foundation, Division of Materials Theory, and the Department of Energy, division of Basic Energy Sciences.

== Books ==
- Coleman, Piers (2015). Introduction to Many-Body Physics. Cambridge, U.K.: Cambridge University Press. ISBN 978-0-521-86488-6.

== See also ==
- Zlatko Tesanovic
