= Egor Babaev =

Russian-born Swedish physicist

- Born: July 8, 1973 (age 53); Leningrad, Russian SFSR
- Education: Uppsala University
- Awards: Tage Erlander Prize, Goran Gustafsson Prize, Fellow of the American Physical Society
- Scientific career
- Fields: Physics, condensed matter theory Superconductivity
- Workplaces: KTH Royal Institute of Technology, University of Massachusetts Amherst
- Academic advisors: Neil Ashcroft, Ludwig Faddeev, Antti Niemi

Egor Babaev (born 1973) is a Russian-born Swedish physicist. In 2001, he received his PhD in theoretical physics from Uppsala University (Sweden). In 2006 he joined the faculty of the KTH Royal Institute of Technology in Stockholm. In 2007-2013 he shared this position with a faculty appointment at Physics Department of the University of Massachusetts, Amherst (USA). He is currently full professor at the Physics Department KTH Royal Institute of Technology.

== History ==
He received multiple awards in recognition of his research on superconductivity and superfluidity. His results, obtained with several collaborators and students, include a theory of new types of superconducting states in multicomponent systems Type-1.5 superconductivity,(reviewed in) theory of metallic and superconducting superfluids and inter-component pairing induced by thermal fluctuation in multicomponent systems (reviewed in), prediction, often referred as Babaev-Faddeev-Niemi hypothesis of unconventional excitations in superconducting state: knotted solitons also dubbed as Hopfions.

He is actively engaged in science communication to general public. Currently he is serving as the co-organiser and chair of the selection committee of the Lise Meitner Distinguished Lecture, the general audience lecture taking place at AlbaNova University Center in Stockholm on annual basis. He coauthored the textbook on modern theory of superfluidity with Boris Svistunov and Nikolay Prokof'ev.

In 2021, Babaev and collaborators published evidence of a "quartic metal", an exotic phase of low-temperature matter that exhibits the breaking of time-reversal symmetry.

== Awards ==
Göran Gustafsson Prize in Physics from the Royal Swedish Academy of Sciences "For original theoretical research which has already shown new ways to understand complex systems and processes in materials physics"

American Physical Society Fellow "For pioneering contributions to the theory of multicomponent superconductors and superfluids"

Tage Erlander prize in Physics of the Royal Swedish Academy of Sciences "For groundbreaking theoretical work that predicts new states of matter in the form of quantum fluids with novel properties"

Outstanding Young Researcher Award from Swedish Research Council

US National Science Foundation CAREER Award
