= Diagrammatic Monte Carlo =

Mathematical physics method

In mathematical physics, the diagrammatic Monte Carlo method is based on stochastic summation of Feynman diagrams with controllable error bars. It was developed by Boris Svistunov and Nikolay Prokof'ev. It was proposed as a generic approach to overcome the numerical sign problem that precludes simulations of many-body fermionic problems. Diagrammatic Monte Carlo works in the thermodynamic limit, and its computational complexity does not scale exponentially with system or cluster volume.
