= Anti-symmetric operator =

Raising and lowering operators

In quantum mechanics, a raising or lowering operator (collectively known as ladder operators) is an operator that increases or decreases the eigenvalue of another operator. In quantum mechanics, the raising operator is sometimes called the creation operator, and the lowering operator the annihilation operator. Well-known applications of ladder operators in quantum mechanics are in the formalisms of the quantum harmonic oscillator and angular momentum.

== Introduction ==
Another type of operator in quantum field theory, discovered in the early 1970s, is known as the anti-symmetric operator. This operator, similar to spin in non-relativistic quantum mechanics is a ladder operator that can create two fermions of opposite spin out of a boson or a boson from two fermions. A Fermion, named after Enrico Fermi, is a particle with a half-integer spin, such as electrons and protons. This is a matter particle. A boson, named after S. N. Bose, is a particle with full integer spin, such as photons and W's. This is a force carrying particle.

== Spin ==
First, we will review spin for non-relativistic quantum mechanics. Spin, an intrinsic property similar to angular momentum, is defined by a spin operator S that plays a role on a system similar to the operator L for orbital angular momentum. The operators $S^2$ and $S_z$ whose eigenvalues are $S^2|s,m\rangle=s(s+1)\hbar^2|s,m\rangle$ and $S_z|s,m\rangle=m\hbar|s,m\rangle$ respectively. These formalisms also obey the usual commutation relations for angular momentum $[S_x,S_y]=i\hbar S_z$, $[S_y,S_z]=i\hbar S_x$, and $[S_z,S_x]=i\hbar S_y$. The raising and lowering operators, $S_{+}$ and $S_{-}$, are defined as $S_{+}=S_x+i\cdot S_y$ and $S_{-}=S_x - i\cdot S_y$ respectively. These ladder operators act on the state in the following $S_+|s,m\rangle=\hbar \sqrt{s(s+1)-m(m+1)}|s,m+1\rangle$ and $S_-|s,m\rangle=\hbar \sqrt{s(s+1)-m(m-1)}|s,m-1\rangle$ respectively.

The operators S_x and S_y can be determined using the ladder method. In the case of the spin 1/2 case (fermion), the operator $S_+$ acting on a state produces $S_+|+\rangle=0$ and $S_+|-\rangle=\hbar|+\rangle$. Likewise, the operator $S_-$ acting on a state produces $S_-|-\rangle=0$ and $S_-|+\rangle=\hbar|-\rangle$. The matrix representations of these operators are constructed as follows:

$$[S_+] = \begin{bmatrix}
\langle+|S_+|+\rangle & \langle+|S_+|-\rangle \\
\langle-|S_+|+\rangle & \langle-|S_+|-\rangle \end{bmatrix}
=
\hbar \cdot
\begin{bmatrix}
0 & 1 \\
0 & 0 \end{bmatrix}$$

$$[S_-] = \begin{bmatrix}
\langle+|S_-|+\rangle & \langle+|S_-|-\rangle \\
\langle-|S_-|+\rangle & \langle-|S_-|-\rangle \end{bmatrix}
=
\hbar \cdot
\begin{bmatrix}
0 & 0 \\
1 & 0 \end{bmatrix}$$

Therefore, $S_x$ and $S_y$ can be represented by the matrix representations:

$$[S_x] = \frac{ \hbar}{2} \cdot
\begin{bmatrix}
0 & 1 \\
1 & 0 \end{bmatrix}$$

$$[S_y] = \frac{ \hbar}{2} \cdot
\begin{bmatrix}
0 & -i \\
i & 0 \end{bmatrix}$$

Recalling the generalized uncertainty relation for two operators A and B, $\Delta_{\psi} A \, \Delta_{\psi} B \ge \frac{1}{2} \left|\left\langle\left[{A},{B}\right]\right\rangle_\psi\right|$, we can immediately see that the uncertainty relation of the operators $S_x$ and $S_y$ are as follows:

$$\Delta_{\psi} S_x \, \Delta_{\psi} S_y \ge \frac{1}{2} \left|\left\langle\left[{S_x},{S_y}\right]\right\rangle_\psi\right|
=
\frac{1}{2} (i \hbar S_z)
=
\frac{ \hbar}{2} S_z$$

Therefore, like orbital angular momentum, we can only specify one coordinate at a time. We specify the operators $S^2$ and $S_z$.

== Application in quantum field theory ==
The creation of a particle and anti-particle from a boson is defined similarly but for infinite dimensions. Therefore, the Levi-Civita symbol for infinite dimensions is introduced.

$$\varepsilon_{ijk\ell\dots} =
\left\{
\begin{matrix}
+1 & \mbox{if }(i,j,k,\ell,\dots) \mbox{ is an even permutation of } (1,2,3,4,\dots) \\
-1 & \mbox{if }(i,j,k,\ell,\dots) \mbox{ is an odd permutation of } (1,2,3,4,\dots) \\
0 & \mbox{if any two labels are the same}
\end{matrix}
\right.$$

The commutation relations are simply carried over to infinite dimensions $[S_i,S_j]=i\hbar S_k\varepsilon_{ijk}$. $S^2$ is now equal to $S^2=\sum_{m=1}^n S_m^2$ where n=∞. Its eigenvalue is $S^2|s,m>=s(s+1)\hbar^2|s,m>$. Defining the magnetic quantum number, angular momentum projected in the z direction, is more challenging than the simple state of spin. The problem becomes analogous to moment of inertia in classical mechanics and is generalizable to n dimensions. It is this property that allows for the creation and annihilation of bosons.

=== Bosons ===
Characterized by their spin, a bosonic field can be scalar fields, vector fields and even tensor fields. To illustrate, the electromagnetic field quantized is the photon field, which can be quantized using conventional methods of canonical or path integral quantization. This has led to the theory of quantum electrodynamics, arguably the most successful theory in physics. The graviton field is the quantized gravitational field. There is yet to be a theory that quantizes the gravitational field, but theories such as string theory can be thought of the gravitational field quantized. An example of a non-relativistic bosonic field is that describing cold bosonic atoms, such as Helium-4. Free bosonic fields obey commutation relations:

$$[a_i,a_j]=[a^\dagger_i,a^\dagger_j]=0$$
$$[a_i,a^\dagger_i]=\langle f|g \rangle$$,

To illustrate, suppose we have a system of N bosons that occupy mutually orthogonal single-particle states $|\phi_1\rang, |\phi_2\rang, |\phi_3\rang$, etc. Using the usual representation, we demonstrate the system by assigning a state to each particle and then imposing exchange symmetry.

$$\frac{1}{\sqrt{3}} \left[ |\phi_1\rang |\phi_2\rang
|\phi_3\rang + |\phi_2\rang |\phi_1\rang |\phi_3\rang + |\phi_3\rang
|\phi_2\rang |\phi_1\rang \right].$$

This wave equation can be represented using a second quantized approach, known as second quantization. The number of particles in each single-particle state is listed.

$$|1, 2, 0, 0, 0, \cdots \rangle,$$

The creation and annihilation operators, which add and subtract particles from multi-particle states. These creation and annihilation operators are very similar to those defined for the quantum harmonic oscillator, which added and subtracted energy quanta. However, these operators literally create and annihilate particles with a given quantum state. The bosonic annihilation operator $a_2$ and creation operator $a_2^\dagger$ have the following effects:

$$a_2 | N_1, N_2, N_3, \cdots \rangle = \sqrt{N_2} \mid N_1, (N_2 - 1), N_3, \cdots \rangle,$$
$$a_2^\dagger | N_1, N_2, N_3, \cdots \rangle = \sqrt{N_2 + 1} \mid N_1, (N_2 + 1), N_3, \cdots \rangle.$$

Like the creation and annihilation operators $a_i$ and $a_i^\dagger$ also found in quantum field theory, the creation and annihilation operators $S_i^+$ and $S_i^-$ act on bosons in multi-particle states. While $a_i$ and $a_i^\dagger$ allows us to determine whether a particle was created or destroyed in a system, the spin operators $S_i^+$ and $S_i^-$ allow us to determine how. A photon can become both a positron and electron and vice versa. Because of the anti-symmetric statistics, a particle of spin $\frac{1}{2}$ obeys the Pauli-Exclusion Rule. Two particles can exist in the same state if and only if the spin of the particle is opposite.

Back to our example, the spin state of the particle is spin-1. Symmetric particles, or bosons, need not obey the Pauli-Exclusion Principle so therefore we can represent the spin state of the particle as follows:

$|1, ix, 0, 0, 0, \cdots \rangle,$ and $|1, -ix, 0, 0, 0, \cdots \rangle,$

The annihilation spin operator, as its name implies, annihilates a photon into both an electron and positron. Likewise, the creation spin operator creates a photon. The photon can be in either the first state or the second state in this example. If we apply the linear momentum operator

=== Fermions ===
Therefore, we define the operator $S_i +$ and $S_i -$. In the case of the non-relativistic particle, if $S_+$ is applied to a fermion twice, the resulting eigenvalue is 0. Similarly, the eigenvalue is 0 when $S_-$ is applied to a fermion twice. This relation satisfies the Pauli Exclusion Principle. However, bosons are symmetric particles, which do not obey the Pauli Exclusion Principle.
