= RVB =

RVB may stand for:

- Ravensbourne railway station, London, National Rail station code
- Red vs. Blue, a comic science fiction video series
- Resonating valence bond theory, of superconductivity
- Return Beam Vidicon, on the satellites Landsat 1-5
- Raymond van Barneveld (born 1967), Dutch professional darts player
