= Ruslan Stratonovich =

Russian mathematician (1930–1997)

Ruslan Leontyevich Stratonovich
- Born: 31 May 1930; Moscow, Russia (Soviet Union)
- Died: 13 January 1997 (aged 66); Moscow, Russia
- Education: Moscow State University
- Known for: Stratonovich integral Stratonovich-Kushner equation Hubbard-Stratonovich transformation
- Awards: State Prize of the Russian Federation
- Scientific career
- Fields: Mathematics
- Doctoral students: Viacheslav Belavkin

Ruslan Leont'evich Stratonovich (Russian: Русла́н Лео́нтьевич Страто́нович) was a Russian physicist, engineer, and probabilist and one of the founders of the theory of stochastic differential equations.

== Biography ==
Ruslan Stratonovich was born on 31 May 1930 in Moscow. He studied from 1947 at the Moscow State University, specializing in there under Pyotr Kuznetsov on radio physics (a Soviet term for oscillation physics – including noise – in the broadest sense, but especially in the electromagnetic spectrum). In 1953 he graduated and came into contact with the mathematician Andrey Kolmogorov. In 1956 he received his doctorate on the application of the theory of correlated random points to the calculation of electronic noise. In 1969 he became professor of physics at the Moscow State University.

== Research ==
Stratonovich invented a stochastic calculus which serves as an alternative to the Itō calculus; the Stratonovich calculus is most natural when physical laws are being considered. The Stratonovich integral appears in his stochastic calculus. Here, the Stratonovich integral is named after him (at the same time developed by Donald Fisk). He also solved the problem of optimal non-linear filtering based on his theory of conditional Markov processes, which was published in his papers in 1959 and 1960. The Kalman-Bucy (linear) filter (1961) is a special case of Stratonovich's filter.

The Hubbard-Stratonovich transformation in the theory of path integrals (or distribution functions of statistical mechanics) was introduced by him (and used by John Hubbard in solid state physics).

In 1965, he developed the theory of pricing information (Value of information), which describes decision-making situations in which it comes to the question of how much someone is going to pay for information.

== Awards ==
- Lomonosov Prize of the Moscow University, 1984
- USSR State Prize, 1988
- State Prize of the Russian Federation, 1996

== See also ==
- Filtering problem (stochastic processes)

== Works ==
- with Pyotr Kuznetsov: The propagation of electromagnetic waves in multiconductor transmission lines, Pergamon Press 1964
- Topics in the theory of random noise, 2 Volumes, Gordon and Breach, 1963, 1967
- with Pyotr Kuznetsov, V. I. Tikhonov: Nonlinear transformation of stochastic processes, Pergamon Press 1965
- Conditional Markov processes and their application to the theory of optimal control, Elsevier 1968
- Nonlinear Nonequilibrium Thermodynamics, 2 Volumes, Springer Series in Synergetics, 1992, 1994 (Volume 1: Linear and Nonlinear Fluctuation-Dissipation Theorem, Volume 2: Advanced Theory)
- Theory of Information and its Value, Springer, 2020 (ed. Roman V. Belavkin, Panos M. Pardalos, Jose C. Principe).
