= Composite field =

Field composed from other elementary fields

In quantum field theory, a composite field is a field defined in terms of other more "elementary" fields. It might describe a composite particle (bound state) or it might not.

It might be local, or it might be nonlocal. However, "quantum fields do not exist as a point taken in isolation," so "local" does not mean literally a single point.

Composite fields use a very specific kind of statistics, called "duality and arbitrary statistics".

Under Noether's theorem, Noether fields are often composite fields, and they are local.

In the generalized LSZ formalism, composite fields, which are usually nonlocal, are used to model asymptotic bound states.

== See also ==
- Fermionic field
- Bosonic field
- Auxiliary field
