= Fermionic field =

Fields giving rise to fermionic particles

In quantum field theory, a fermionic field is a quantum field whose quanta are fermions; that is, they obey Fermi–Dirac statistics. Fermionic fields obey canonical anticommutation relations rather than the canonical commutation relations of bosonic fields.

The most prominent example of a fermionic field is the Dirac field, which describes fermions with spin-1/2: electrons, protons, quarks, etc. The Dirac field can be described as either a 4-component spinor or as a pair of 2-component Weyl spinors. Spin-1/2 Majorana fermions, such as the hypothetical neutralino, can be described as either a dependent 4-component Majorana spinor or a single 2-component Weyl spinor. It is not known whether the neutrino is a Majorana fermion or a Dirac fermion; observing neutrinoless double-beta decay experimentally would settle this question.

== Basic properties ==
Free (non-interacting) fermionic fields obey canonical anticommutation relations; i.e., involve the anticommutators {a, b} = ab + ba, rather than the commutators [a, b] = ab − ba of bosonic or standard quantum mechanics. Those relations also hold for interacting fermionic fields in the interaction picture, where the fields evolve in time as if free and the effects of the interaction are encoded in the evolution of the states.

It is these anticommutation relations that imply Fermi–Dirac statistics for the field quanta. They also result in the Pauli exclusion principle: two fermionic particles cannot occupy the same state at the same time.

== Dirac fields ==
The prominent example of a spin-1/2 fermion field is the Dirac field (named after Paul Dirac), and denoted by $\psi(x)$. The equation of motion for a free spin 1/2 particle is the Dirac equation,

$$\left(i\gamma^\mu \partial_\mu - m\right) \psi(x) = 0.\,$$

where $\gamma^{\mu}$ are gamma matrices and $m$ is the mass. The simplest possible solutions $\psi(x)$ to this equation are plane wave solutions, $u(p)e^{-ip\cdot x}\,$ and $v(p)e^{ip\cdot x}\,$. These plane wave solutions form a basis for the Fourier components of $\psi(x)$, allowing for the general expansion of the wave function as follows,

$$\psi_{\alpha}(x) = \int \frac{d^3 p}{(2\pi)^3} \frac{1}{\sqrt{2E_p}} \sum_{s} \left(a^s_\mathbf{p} u^s_{\alpha}(p) e^{-ip \cdot x} + b^{s\dagger}_\mathbf{p} v^s_{\alpha}(p) e^{ip \cdot x}\right).\,$$

Here u and v are spinors labelled by their spin s and spinor indices $\alpha \in \{0,1,2,3\}$. For the electron, a spin 1/2 particle, s = +1/2 or s = −1/2. The energy factor is the result of having a Lorentz invariant integration measure. In second quantization, $\psi(x)$ is promoted to an operator, so the coefficients of its Fourier modes must be operators too. Hence, $a^{s}_{\mathbf{p}}$ and $b^{s \dagger}_{\mathbf{p}}$ are operators. The properties of these operators can be discerned from the properties of the field. $\psi(x)$ and $\psi(y)^{\dagger}$ obey the anticommutation relations:

$$\left\{\psi_{\alpha}(\mathbf{x}), \psi_{\beta}^\dagger(\mathbf{y})\right\} = \delta^{(3)}(\mathbf{x} - \mathbf{y})\delta_{\alpha\beta}.$$

We impose an anticommutator relation (as opposed to a commutation relation as we do for the bosonic field) in order to make the operators compatible with Fermi–Dirac statistics. By putting in the expansions for $\psi(x)$ and $\psi(y)$, the anticommutation relations for the coefficients can be computed.

$$\left\{a^r_\mathbf{p}, a^{s \dagger}_\mathbf{q}\right\} = \left\{b^r_\mathbf{p}, b^{s\dagger}_\mathbf{q}\right\} = (2\pi)^{3} \delta^3 (\mathbf{p} - \mathbf{q}) \delta^{rs},\,$$

In a manner analogous to non-relativistic annihilation and creation operators and their commutators, these algebras lead to the physical interpretation that $a^{s \dagger}_{\mathbf{p}}$ creates a fermion of momentum p and spin s, and $b^{r \dagger}_{\mathbf{q}}$ creates an antifermion of momentum q and spin r. The general field $\psi(x)$ is now seen to be a weighted (by the energy factor) summation over all possible spins and momenta for creating fermions and antifermions. Its conjugate field, $\overline{\psi} \ \stackrel{\mathrm{def}}{=}\ \psi^{\dagger} \gamma^{0}$, is the opposite, a weighted summation over all possible spins and momenta for annihilating fermions and antifermions.

With the field modes understood and the conjugate field defined, it is possible to construct Lorentz invariant quantities for fermionic fields. The simplest is the quantity $\overline{\psi}\psi\,$. This makes the reason for the choice of $\overline{\psi} = \psi^{\dagger} \gamma^{0}$clear. This is because the general Lorentz transform on $\psi$ is not unitary so the quantity $\psi^{\dagger}\psi$ would not be invariant under such transforms, so the inclusion of $\gamma^{0}\,$ is to correct for this. The other possible non-zero Lorentz invariant quantity, up to an overall conjugation, constructible from the fermionic fields is $\overline{\psi}\gamma^{\mu}\partial_{\mu}\psi$.

Since linear combinations of these quantities are also Lorentz invariant, this leads naturally to the Lagrangian density for the Dirac field by the requirement that the Euler–Lagrange equation of the system recover the Dirac equation.

$$\mathcal{L}_D = \overline{\psi}\left(i\gamma^\mu \partial_\mu - m\right)\psi\,$$

Such an expression has its indices suppressed. When reintroduced the full expression is

$$\mathcal{L}_D = \overline{\psi}_a\left(i\gamma^\mu_{ab} \partial_\mu - m\mathbb{I}_{ab}\right)\psi_b\,$$

The Hamiltonian (energy) density can also be constructed by first defining the momentum canonically conjugate to $\psi(x)$, called $\Pi(x):$

$$\Pi \ \overset{\mathrm{def}}{=}\  \frac{\partial \mathcal{L}_{D}}{\partial (\partial_0 \psi)} = i\psi^\dagger\,.$$

With that definition of $\Pi$, the Hamiltonian density is:

$$\mathcal{H}_D = \overline{\psi}\left[-i\vec{\gamma} \cdot \vec{\nabla} + m\right] \psi\,,$$

where $\vec{\nabla}$ is the standard gradient of the space-like coordinates, and $\vec{\gamma}$ is a vector of the space-like $\gamma$ matrices. It is surprising that the Hamiltonian density doesn't depend on the time derivative of $\psi$, directly, but the expression is correct.

Given the expression for $\psi(x)$ we can construct the Feynman propagator for the fermion field:

$$D_F(x - y) = \left\langle 0\left| T(\psi(x) \overline{\psi}(y))\right| 0 \right\rangle$$

we define the time-ordered product for fermions with a minus sign due to their anticommuting nature

$$T\left[\psi(x) \overline{\psi}(y)\right] \ \overset{\text{def}}{=}\
\theta\left(x^0 - y^0\right) \psi(x) \overline{\psi}(y) - \theta\left(y^0 - x^0\right) \overline\psi(y) \psi(x).$$

Plugging our plane wave expansion for the fermion field into the above equation yields:

$$D_F(x - y) = \int \frac{d^4 p}{(2\pi)^4} \frac{i({p\!\!\!/} + m)}{p^2 - m^2 + i\epsilon}e^{-ip \cdot (x - y)}$$

where we have employed the Feynman slash notation. This result makes sense since the factor

$$\frac{i({p\!\!\!/} + m)}{p^2 - m^2}$$

is just the inverse of the operator acting on $\psi(x)$ in the Dirac equation. Note that the Feynman propagator for the Klein–Gordon field has this same property. Since all reasonable observables (such as energy, charge, particle number, etc.) are built out of an even number of fermion fields, the commutation relation vanishes between any two observables at spacetime points outside the light cone. As we know from elementary quantum mechanics two simultaneously commuting observables can be measured simultaneously. We have therefore correctly implemented Lorentz invariance for the Dirac field, and preserved causality.

More complicated field theories involving interactions (such as Yukawa theory, or quantum electrodynamics) can be analyzed too, by various perturbative and non-perturbative methods.

Dirac fields are an important ingredient of the Standard Model.

== See also ==
- Dirac equation
- Spin–statistics theorem
- Spinor
- Composite Field
- Auxiliary Field
