= Bernice Durand =

American particle physicist (1942–2022)

- Born: December 28, 1942
- Died: February 7, 2022 (aged 79)
- Education: Iowa State University
- Known for: Particle physics
- Spouse: Loyal Durand
- Scientific career
- Workplaces: University of Wisconsin, Madison
- Thesis: A point and local position operator (1971)
- Doctoral students: Ina Šarčević

Bernice Black Durand (28 December 1942 - 7 February 2022) was an American particle physicist and emeritus Professor at the University of Wisconsin–Madison. She was also the emeritus Vice Provost for Diversity and Climate.

== Early life and education ==
Durand was born in Clarion, Iowa. Her father studied mechanical engineering at Iowa State University and Harvard University, and joined the United States Army Corps of Engineers. She grew up in Ames and attended Radcliffe College, but never finished her course. She eventually completed her bachelor's degree from Iowa State University in 1965. She earned her PhD with a dissertation titled A point and local position operator, in 1971. She was a member of Sigma Delta Epsilon. From 1992 she has endowed an undergraduate research scholarship at Iowa State University, which provides financial support for a member of an under-represented group to complete a summer project. Durand died on February 7, 2022, from complications with Alzheimer's Disease.

== Research and career ==
Durand was appointed to the University of Wisconsin–Madison in 1970. She was a much celebrated teacher, teaching all levels at University of Wisconsin–Madison. She appeared in the Aspen Center for Physics video series. She worked on the SVZ method to calculate hadronic masses as well as heavy-quark systems. During her career she was a visiting scientist in several national facilities. She worked at the Fermi National Accelerator Laboratory in 1973, 1982 and 1984. She also worked at Los Alamos National Laboratory, the Institute for Advanced Study and California Institute of Technology. In 1994, Iowa State University endowed a brick in the Iowa State University Plaza of Heroines.

Durand has been involved in several initiatives to improve diversity amongst the faculty and student population at University of Wisconsin–Madison. She directed an Alfred P. Sloan Foundation grant that promoted equity and career flexibility for all academic staff. She was a founder of the National Science Foundation Women in Science and Engineering Leadership Institute. She served on the Committee on the Status of Women in Physics. Her efforts were widely appreciated; in 2002 she received the Chancellor's Recognition Award for Outstanding Leadership and the Faculty and Staff Recognition Award from the Wisconsin Alumni Association's Cabinet 99. In her final five years at UW Madison, Durand was appointed the first Vice Provost for Diversity and Climate, in charge of all university climate and diversity programs. A Faculty Fellowship in physics has since been established in her honor.

Durand endorsed Barack Obama in the 2008 United States presidential election. She campaigned for the democratic candidate, working with over thirty scientists to publish articles and letters in newspapers across the country.
