= Loyal Durand =

American theoretical physicist

- Born: May 19, 1931; Madison, Wisconsin, U.S.
- Education: Yale University (B.S. 1953; Ph.D. 1957)
- Known for: High-energy physics
- Spouse(s): Wesley Ann Travis, Bernice Durand
- Awards: Fellow, APS
- Scientific career
- Fields: Theoretical particle physics
- Workplaces: Yale University; University of Wisconsin-Madison
- Thesis: Vacuum polarization effects in proton-proton scattering (1957)
- Doctoral advisor: Gregory Breit

Loyal Durand (also known as L. Durand III or Randy Durand) is an American theoretical physicist and Professor Emeritus of Physics at the University of Wisconsin-Madison. He is recognized for his contributions to high-energy particle physics, especially phenomenological models of scattering and applications of QCD, contributions to special functions and mathematical physics, and work at the Aspen Center for Physics.

== Early life and education ==
Loyal Durand earned his B.S. in Physics from Yale University in 1953. He then remained at Yale for graduate studies and completed his Ph.D. in 1957 under Gregory Breit. His thesis examined vacuum polarization effects in proton-proton scattering.

== Career ==
After completing his doctorate, Durand held postdoctoral appointments at the Institute for Advanced Study (1957-1959) and Brookhaven National Laboratory (1959-1961). He joined the Yale faculty in 1961 and remained there until 1965, when he moved to the University of Wisconsin-Madison as a full professor of physics, a position he held until his retirement as Professor Emeritus. He has held visiting or staff positions at (or served on advisory committees for) major national laboratories including Brookhaven National Laboratory, Argonne National Laboratory, Fermilab, and Los Alamos National Laboratory.

Durand’s association with the Aspen Center for Physics began in 1962 and continued for more than six decades. He served as Chair of the Executive Committee (1968-1972), President (1972-1976), Trustee (1968-1980), and has been an Honorary Trustee since 1980. In addition to these organizational roles, he helped in documenting the Center’s history through essays and oral history interviews that preserve the early development of theoretical physics programs at the institution. He has lived full-time in Aspen since 2011.

== Research ==
Durand’s research has been on theoretical particle physics.

An early contribution was his 1962 calculation of pionic (hadronic) contributions to the anomalous magnetic moment of the muon.

An early paper in high-energy phenomenology was his 1968 collaboration with R. Lipes on a diffraction model for high-energy proton-proton scattering.

Representative of his work on special functions is the 1976 paper with P. M. Fishbane and L. M. Simmons, Jr., on expansion formulas and addition theorems for Gegenbauer functions.

In later work he explored semihard QCD effects, the relationship between virtual and real scattering cross sections, and other topics that extended into publications through the 2010s. Durand frequently collaborated with his wife, physicist Bernice Durand, on topics including duality in heavy-quark systems.

== Honors and leadership ==
Durand was elected a Fellow of the American Physical Society in 1971.

His long-term leadership at the Aspen Center for Physics, combined with his efforts to document its institutional history, has been acknowledged within the theoretical physics community.

== Personal life ==
Durand was married to Wesley Ann Travis from 1954 to 1966. One of their sons is Christopher A. Durand, a stuntman, actor, and writer (professionally known as Chris Durand).

In October 1970 he married physicist Bernice Durand (née Black). The couple collaborated on multiple research papers and jointly endowed undergraduate research scholarships in physics and astronomy at the University of Wisconsin and Iowa State University. Bernice Durand died in February 2022.

== Selected publications ==
- Durand, L. (1962). "Pionic contributions to the anomalous magnetic moment of the muon". Physical Review. 128: 441–448.
- Durand III, L.; Lipes, R. (1968). "Diffraction Model for High-Energy pp Scattering". Physical Review Letters. 20 (12): 637–640. doi:10.1103/PhysRevLett.20.637.
- Durand, L.; Pi, Hong (1987). "QCD and rising cross sections". Physical Review Letters. 58 (4): 303. doi:10.1103/PhysRevLett.58.303.
- Durand, L.; Pi, H. (1989). "Semihard QCD and high-energy pp and p¯p scattering". Physical Review D. 40 (5): 1436.
- Durand III, L.; Chiu, Y. T. (1965). "Absorptive Processes and Single-Particle Exchange Models at High Energies. I. General Theory". Physical Review. 139 (3B): B646.
- Durand, L.; Fishbane, P. M.; Simmons, Jr., L. M. (1976). "Expansion formulas and addition theorems for Gegenbauer functions". Journal of Mathematical Physics. 17 (11): 1933–1948.
- Block, M. M.; Durand, L.; Ha, P. (2014). "Connection of the virtual cross section of deep inelastic scattering to real scattering, and the implications for σγp and σpp total cross sections". Physical Review D. 89 (9): 094027.
