= Ganapathy Baskaran =

Indian theoretical physicist

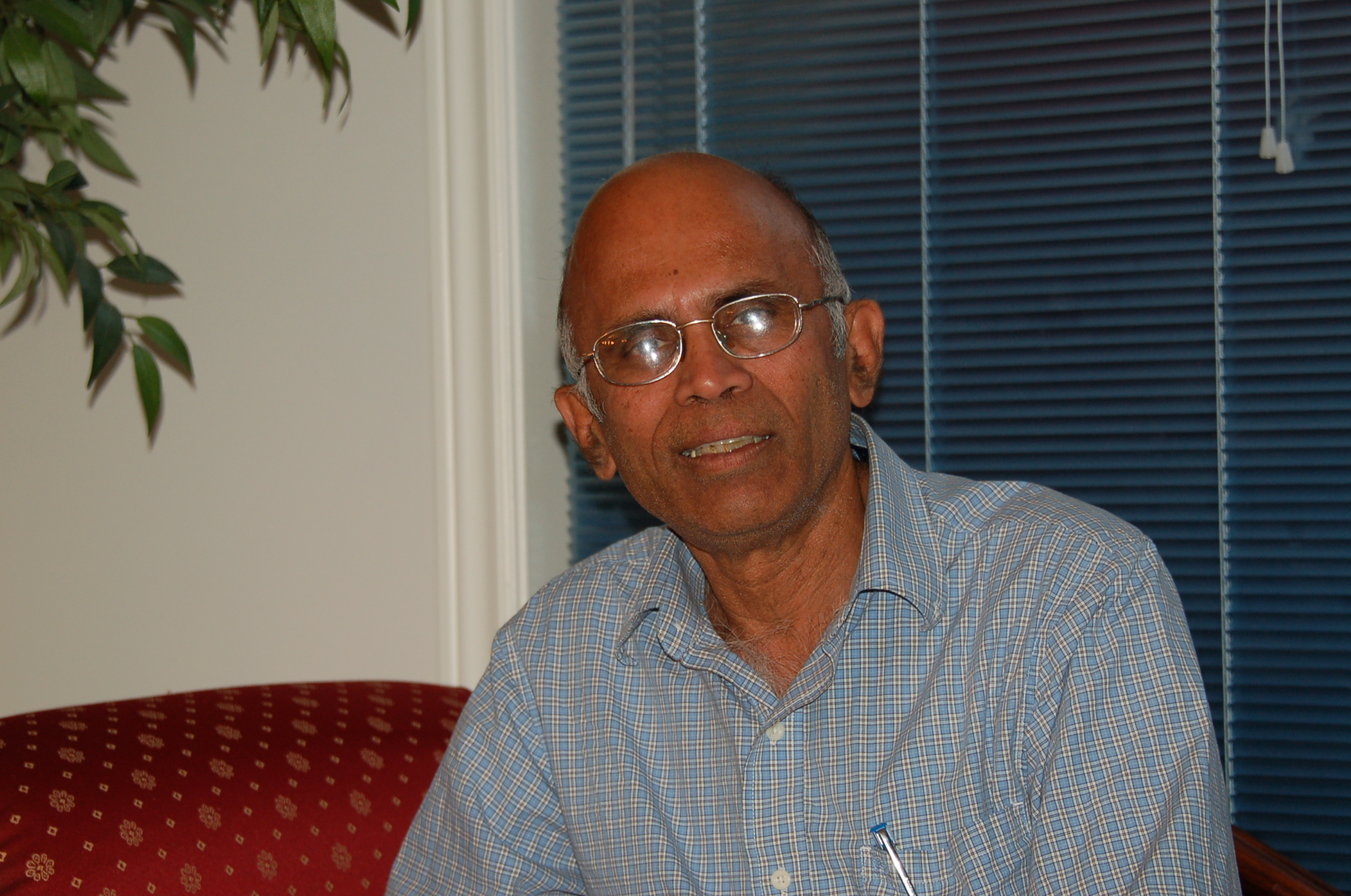
- Baskaran in 2014
- Education: Indian Institute of Science; The American College in Madurai; Thiagarajar college
- Known for: Resonating valence bond theory
- Awards: Shanti Swarup Bhatnagar Award (1990); ICTP Prize (1983); G.N. Ramachandran - SASTRA Award (2019)
- Scientific career
- Fields: Condensed matter theory, Strongly correlated materials
- Workplaces: Institute of Mathematical Sciences; Perimeter Institute; IIT Madras

Ganapathy Baskaran is an Indian theoretical physicist, known for his work on condensed matter physics and strongly correlated quantum materials. Baskaran is an Emeritus Professor of physics at the Institute of Mathematical Sciences in Chennai, India and holds a Distinguished Visiting Research Chair at the Perimeter Institute for Theoretical Physics in Waterloo, Canada. Recently he became a distinguished professor at the Indian Institute of Technology, Madras (Chennai), India.

Baskaran completed his undergraduate education at the Thiagarajar college and the American College in Madurai, India. He got his PhD in theoretical physics from the Indian Institute of Science, Bangalore in 1975.

In 1987–88, Baskaran, along with P.W. Anderson at Princeton University, developed the resonating valence bond theory to describe the behavior of high-temperature superconductors. Baskaran is also known for his discovery of emergent gauge fields in strongly correlated systems, predictions of p-wave superconductivity in strontium ruthenate and of high-temperature superconductivity in graphene and graphite at optimal doping.

In 1983, Baskaran was the first recipient of the ICTP Prize awarded by the International Center for Theoretical Physics, Trieste, Italy to young scientists in developing countries for work in physics and mathematics. He was a Member at the Institute for Advanced Study in 1996. He was also awarded the Shanti Swarup Bhatnagar Prize by the Government of India in 1990; and in 2019 he was awarded the G.N. Ramachandran - SASTRA Award. He also obtained Distinguished Alumni Award of the Indian Institute of Science, Bangalore and The Thiagarajar College, Madurai, India.
