= Zlatko Tesanovic =

Professor of Physics

Zlatko Boško Tešanović
- Zlatka Tešanovića
- Born: August 1, 1956; Sarajevo
- Died: July 26, 2012 (aged 55); Washington, D.C., US
- Resting place: East Lawn Palms Cemetery and Mortuary, Tucson, Arizona, US
- Citizenship: Yugoslavia; Bosnia and Herzegovina; United States
- Education: Ph.D. in Physics, University of Minnesota (1980-1985); B.Sc. in Physics, summa cum laude, University of Sarajevo, former Yugoslavia (1975-1979)
- Alma mater: University of Sarajevo; University of Minnesota
- Spouse(s): Ina Šarčević, a professor of physics at the University of Arizona and daughter of Philosophy Professor Abdulah Šarčević.
- Children: Rachel Šarčević-Tešanović, a Johns Hopkins graduate.
- Awards: Foreign Member, The Royal Norwegian Society of Sciences and Letters; Fellow, The American Physical Society, Division of Condensed Matter Physics; Inaugural Speaker, J. R. Schrieffer Tutorial Lecture Series, National High Magnetic Field Laboratory (1997); David and Lucile Packard Foundation Fellowship (1988-1994); J. R. Oppenheimer Fellowship, Los Alamos National Laboratory, 1985 (declined); Stanwood Johnston Memorial Fellowship, University of Minnesota (1984); Shevlin Fellowship, University of Minnesota (1983); Fulbright Fellowship, U.S. Institute of International Education (1980)
- Scientific career
- Fields: Condensed-Matter Physics; Strongly Correlated Electrons; HTS; Quantum Hall Effects; Quantum Mechanics; High magnetic fields

Zlatko Boško Tešanović (August 1, 1956 – July 26, 2012) was a Yugoslav-American theoretical condensed-matter physicist, whose work focused mainly on the high-temperature superconductors (HTS) and related materials.

His particular research interests were in the areas of theoretical condensed matter physics, revolving primarily around iron- and copper-based high-temperature superconductors, quantum Hall effects (QHE), superconductivity and strongly correlated electron materials. His broad knowledge of condensed matter physics, his deep understanding of the effects of strong magnetic fields, and his talent for exposition were influential.

== Biography ==
He was born in Sarajevo, former Yugoslavia (present Bosnia and Herzegovina). In 1979, he received a B.Sci. in physics from the University of Sarajevo. He then received a Fulbright Fellowship and attended the University of Minnesota, where he earned a Ph.D. in physics in 1985. He became a naturalized American citizen.

He worked as a professor of physics at Johns Hopkins University (JHU) in the Henry A. Rowland Department of Physics and Astronomy in Baltimore from July 1987 until his death on July 26, 2012. Previously, he served as director of the TIPAC Theory Center at JHU.

He was a foreign member of the Royal Norwegian Society of Sciences and Letters and a fellow of the APS Division of Condensed Matter Physics (DCMP). He served as a member of the committee to Assess the Current Status and Future Direction of High Magnetic Field Science in the United States, and contributed strongly to it, until his death.

== Students ==
Among his graduate students are:

- Lei Xing (Jacob Haimson Professor, Stanford University)
- Igor F. Herbut (Professor, Simon Fraser University)
- Anton Andreev (Associate Professor, University of Washington)
- Sasha Dukan (Professor and Chair of Physics, Goucher College)
- Oskar Vafek (Associate Professor, Florida State University and NHMFL)
- Ashot Melikyan (Editor, Physical Review B)
- Andrés Concha (Postdoctoral Fellow, Harvard SEAS)
- Valentin Stanev (Postdoctoral Fellow, Argonne National Laboratory)
- Jian Kang (Grad student, Johns Hopkins University)

== Works ==
He gave more than 100 invited talks at scientific meetings, including major international conferences. He has authored and published more than 125 scientific papers, and a book entitled:

- Zlatko Tesanovic, ed. (1990). Field Theories in Condensed Matter Physics: A Workshop. Addison-Wesley Publishing Company. pp. 208 pages. ISBN 978-0-201-50391-3.

== Honors and awards ==
- Fulbright Fellowship, U.S. Institute of International Education (1980)
- Shevlin Fellowship, University of Minnesota (1983)
- Stanwood Johnston Memorial Fellowship, University of Minnesota (1984)
- J. R. Oppenheimer Fellowship, Los Alamos National Laboratory, 1985 (declined)
- David and Lucile Packard Foundation Fellowship (1988-1994)
- Inaugural Speaker, J. R. Schrieffer Tutorial Lecture Series, National High Magnetic Field Laboratory (1997)
- Foreign Member, The Royal Norwegian Society of Sciences and Letters
- Fellow, The American Physical Society, Division of Condensed Matter Physics

He received grants from the Department of Energy, and the National Science Foundation awarded him a post-doctoral fellowship that enabled him to spend two years studying at Harvard University.

== Death ==
He died on July 26, 2012, at the age of 55 of an "apparent" heart attack at the George Washington University Hospital in Washington, D.C., after collapsing at Reagan National Airport.

On March 23, 2013, the Johns Hopkins University Department of Physics and Astronomy organised a memorial symposium as a tribute to him. A number of distinguished speakers have been invited to highlight Zlatko's scientific accomplishments.

== See also ==
- List of American Physical Society Fellows (2011–)
- List of theoretical physicists
- Piers Coleman
- Alexei Alexeyevich Abrikosov
- Edward Witten
- Joseph Polchinski
