= Premala Chandra =

American physicist

- Born: United States
- Education: Yale University; University of California, Santa Barbara
- Known for: Quantum and electromagnetic behavior of matter at the nanoscale
- Spouse: Piers Coleman
- Awards: Fellow of the American Physical Society (2013)
- Scientific career
- Fields: Theoretical condensed matter physics
- Workplaces: Rutgers University
- Doctoral advisor: James S. Langer
- Website: Rutgers faculty page

Premala "Premi" Chandra is an American theoretical condensed matter physicist whose research concerns the quantum mechanical and electromagnetic behavior of matter at the nanoscale, especially on two-dimensional surfaces. She is a professor in the Department of Physics and Astronomy at Rutgers University.

== Education and career ==
Chandra graduated summa cum laude from Yale University in 1981. Despite a love for mathematics and science, and pressure from her mother to become a physicist, she started her studies in history, but switched to physics after being persuaded by her mother that she was "just running away from what you love". After graduating, she worked in industry as a research technician for Exxon for two years, and then continued her graduate studies at the University of California, Santa Barbara. After visiting Princeton University under a UC Regents Fellowship, she completed her Ph.D. at UC Santa Barbara in 1988, under the supervision of James S. Langer.

Next, Chandra returned to Exxon as a postdoctoral researcher for two years. She became a research scientist at the NEC Research Institute in 1990, and a senior research scientist there in 2001. The institute closed in late 2002, and was merged into a more applied laboratory that no longer focused on basic research. Soon after, in 2003, Chandra took her present position as a professor at Rutgers University.

== Recognition ==
Chandra was elected as a Fellow of the American Physical Society, in the 2013 class of fellows, "for contributions to the theory of frustrated antiferromagnets and glasses, ferroelectrics and heavy fermion materials".

== Personal life ==
Chandra grew up in New Jersey, as the elder of two daughters of Indian-American mathematical physicist Harish-Chandra and Lalitha "Lily" Kale. Kale, whose mother was a Polish Jew, was born in Warsaw but grew up in Bangalore after her family fled Poland in 1939 or 1940. As a child Chandra missed two years of schooling because of asthma, which she countered by athletics, first on a swim team and at Yale as a member of the crew team.

Chandra is married to Piers Coleman, a British physicist also affiliated with Rutgers University.
