= Viacheslav Belavkin =

Russian mathematician (1946–2012)

- Born: 20 May 1946; Lviv
- Died: 27 November 2012 (aged 66)
- Education: Moscow State University
- Known for: Belavkin equation Choi's theorem on completely positive maps
- Awards: State Prize of the Russian Federation
- Scientific career
- Fields: Mathematics
- Workplaces: University of Nottingham
- Doctoral advisor: Ruslan Stratonovich

Viacheslav Pavlovich Belavkin (Russian: Вячеслав Павлович Белавкин; 20 May 1946 – 27 November 2012) was a Russian-British professor in applied mathematics at the University of Nottingham. An active researcher, he was one of the pioneers of quantum probability. His research spanned areas such as quantum filtering, quantum information and quantum chaos.

== Biography ==
He was born in Lviv, and graduated from Moscow State University in 1970 where his teachers include Evgeny Lifshitz, Victor Pavlovich Maslov, Andrey Kolmogorov and Ruslan L. Stratonovich. In the 1980s Belavkin held visiting professorship in the Dublin Institute for Advanced Studies, and the Volterra Centre in Rome before taking up an appointment at the University of Nottingham in 1992. He was promoted to a Chair in Mathematical Physics in 1996. He and Ruslan L. Stratonovich were awarded the State Prize of the Russian Federation (formerly the Lenin Prize) for outstanding achievements in science and technology, in part due to his work on the measurement problem. He is survived by his wife Nadezda Belavkin and son Roman Belavkin (also known as Solar X).
