= Nikolay Prokof'ev =

Russian-American physicist

- Born: Moscow, Russia
- Education: Moscow Engineering Physics Institute
- Known for: Diagrammatic Monte Carlo
- Awards: Fellow of the American Physical Society
- Scientific career
- Fields: Physics, Condensed Matter Theory
- Workplaces: University of Massachusetts Amherst
- Academic advisors: Yuri Kagan

Nikolay Victorovich Prokof'ev is a Russian-American physicist known for his works on supersolidity and strongly correlated systems and pioneering numerical approaches.

== Biography ==
He received his MSc in physics in 1982 from Moscow Engineering Physics Institute, Moscow, Russia. In 1987, he received his PhD in theoretical physics from Kurchatov Institute (Moscow), under the supervision of Yuri Kagan, where he worked from 1984 to 1999. In 1999, he became a professor at the physics department of the University of Massachusetts Amherst.

=== Research ===
He is recognised for his research on strongly correlated states in electronic and bosonic systems, critical phenomena, and quantum Monte Carlo methods.

His and his coauthors have made key contributions to the theory of supersolids, including the theory of superfluidity of crystalline defects, such as the emergence of superfluidity at grain boundaries and in dislocation cores, and the theory of the superglass state. Together with Boris Svistunov and Igor Tupitsyn, he co-invented the widely used Monte Carlo worm algorithm. With Svistunov, he also developed the diagrammatic Monte Carlo method, a technique for the stochastic summation of Feynman diagrams that is free from the numerical sign problem.

He is an elected Fellow of the American Physical Society, for "pioneering contributions to theories of dissipative quantum dynamics and for innovative Monte Carlo approaches to quantum and classical studies of critical phenomena."

He coauthored the book on modern theory of superfluidity.
