= Ina Šarčević =

Yugoslav-American astrophysicist

Ina Šarčević (born March 18, 1959) is a Yugoslav-American theoretical astrophysicist who studies high-energy cosmic particles, especially neutrinos, and the implications of particle physics for dark matter and cosmology. She is a professor of physics and of astronomy at the University of Arizona.

== Education and career ==
Šarčević graduated in 1981 from the University of Sarajevo, and completed her Ph.D. in physics in 1986 at the University of Minnesota. Her doctoral advisor was Bernice Durand.

After postdoctoral research at the Los Alamos National Laboratory, she joined the University of Arizona faculty as an assistant professor of physics in 1988. She became an associate professor in 1993 and full processor in 1999, adding a second affiliation as professor of astronomy in 2008.

== Recognition ==
Šarčević was named a Humboldt Fellow in 1989. She was elected as a Fellow of the American Physical Society (APS) in 2006, after a nomination from the APS Division of Particles and Fields, "for outstanding contributions to physics of ultrahigh-energy neutrinos and cosmic rays".

== Personal life ==
Šarčević was married to Zlatko Tesanovic, a condensed-matter physicist at Johns Hopkins University who died in 2012.
