= Statistical field theory =

Framework to describe phase transitions

In theoretical physics, statistical field theory (SFT) is a theoretical framework that describes systems with many degrees of freedom, particularly near phase transitions. It does not denote a single theory but encompasses many models, including for magnetism, superconductivity, superfluidity, topological phase transition, wetting as well as non-equilibrium phase transitions. A SFT is any model in statistical mechanics where the degrees of freedom comprise a field or fields. In other words, the microstates of the system are expressed through field configurations. It is closely related to quantum field theory, which describes the quantum mechanics of fields, and shares with it many techniques, such as the path integral formulation and renormalization. If the system involves polymers, it is also known as polymer field theory.

In fact, by performing a Wick rotation from Minkowski space to Euclidean space, many results of statistical field theory can be applied directly to its quantum equivalent. The correlation functions of a statistical field theory are called Schwinger functions, and their properties are described by the Osterwalder–Schrader axioms.

Statistical field theories are widely used to describe systems in polymer physics or biophysics, such as polymer films, nanostructured block copolymers or polyelectrolytes.
