= Boris Svistunov =

Russian-American physicist

- Born: October 22, 1959 (age 66); Moscow, Russia
- Education: Moscow Engineering Physics Institute
- Awards: Fellow of the American Physical Society
- Scientific career
- Fields: Physics, Condensed Matter Theory
- Workplaces: University of Massachusetts Amherst
- Academic advisors: Yuri Kagan

Boris Vladimirovich Svistunov (Russian: Борис Владимирович Свистунов; born October 22, 1959) is a Russian-American physicist specialised in the condensed matter physics. He received his MSc in physics in 1983 from Moscow Engineering Physics Institute, Moscow. In 1990, he received his PhD in theoretical physics from Kurchatov Institute (Moscow), where he worked from 1986 to 2003 (and is still affiliated with). In 2003, he joined the Physics Department of the University of Massachusetts, Amherst where he is currently full professor. He is currently also an affiliated faculty member of Wilczek Quantum Center in Shanghai at SJTU and is a participant of Simons collaboration on many electron systems.

Boris Svistunov is recognised for his works on superfluidity, supersolidity, superfluid turbulence, strongly correlated systems and pioneering numerical approaches. With his collaborators and students he made important contributions to superfluid turbulence (reviewed in), theory of supersolids, in collaboration with Nikolay Prokof'ev including the theory of superfluidity of crystalline defects (reviewed in) and superglass phase.

He is a co-inventor, with Nikolay Prokof'ev and Igor Tupitsyn of the widely used Worm Monte-Carlo algorithm. With Nikolay Prokof'ev he invented Diagrammatic Monte-Carlo method which is stochastic summation of Feynman diagrammatic series. Because the method is free from the Numerical sign problem it allowed to solve previously untreatable fermionic problems. He is elected Fellow of the American Physical Society for his highly influential works in superfluidity and supersolidity.

His research was recognised by his election as Fellow of the American Physical Society. The citation associated with of his Fellow election in the American Physical Society, for "pioneering contributions to the theory and practice of Monte Carlo simulations for strongly correlated quantum and classical systems, the invention of the worm algorithm and diagrammatic Monte Carlo techniques, and fundamental theoretical results on superfluid phenomena in quantum gases, liquids, and solids."

He is Outstanding Referee for American Physical Society and Distinguished Referee for Europhysics letters.

He co-authored the book on modern theory of Superfluidity

== See also ==
- List of fellows of the American Physical Society (1998–2010)
