= Auxiliary field =

In physics, and especially quantum field theory, an auxiliary field is one whose equations of motion admit a single solution. Therefore, the Lagrangian describing such a field $A$ contains an algebraic quadratic term and an arbitrary linear term, while it contains no kinetic terms (derivatives of the field):

$$\mathcal{L}_\text{aux} = \frac{1}{2}(A, A) + (f(\varphi), A).$$

The equation of motion for $A$ is

$$A(\varphi) = -f(\varphi),$$

and the Lagrangian becomes

$$\mathcal{L}_\text{aux} = -\frac{1}{2}(f(\varphi), f(\varphi)).$$

Auxiliary fields generally do not propagate, and hence the content of any theory can remain unchanged in many circumstances by adding such fields by hand. If we have an initial Lagrangian $\mathcal{L}_0$ describing a field $\varphi$, then the Lagrangian describing both fields is

$$\mathcal{L} = \mathcal{L}_0(\varphi) + \mathcal{L}_\text{aux} = \mathcal{L}_0(\varphi) - \frac{1}{2}\big(f(\varphi), f(\varphi)\big).$$

Therefore, auxiliary fields can be employed to cancel quadratic terms in $\varphi$ in $\mathcal{L}_0$ and linearize the action $\mathcal{S} = \int \mathcal{L} \,d^n x$.

Examples of auxiliary fields are the complex scalar field F in a chiral superfield, the real scalar field D in a vector superfield, the scalar field B in BRST and the field in the Hubbard–Stratonovich transformation.

The quantum mechanical effect of adding an auxiliary field is the same as the classical, since the path integral over such a field is Gaussian. To wit:

$$\int_{-\infty}^\infty dA\, e^{-\frac{1}{2} A^2 + A f} = \sqrt{2\pi}e^{\frac{f^2}{2}}.$$

== See also ==
- Bosonic field
- Fermionic field
- Composite Field
