= John Hubbard (physicist) =

British physicist (1931–1980)

- Born: 27 October 1931; London, UK
- Died: 27 November 1980 (aged 49); San Jose, California
- Education: Imperial College London
- Known for: Hubbard model; Hubbard operator; Hubbard–Stratonovich transformation
- Scientific career
- Fields: Theoretical condensed matter physics
- Workplaces: Atomic Energy Research Establishment; IBM San Jose Research Laboratory
- Thesis: (1958)
- Doctoral advisor: Stanley Raimes

John Hubbard (October 27, 1931 – November 27, 1980) was a British physicist working in the areas of solid-state and condensed matter physics. He is best known for the Hubbard model for interacting electrons and the Hubbard–Stratonovich transformation, both of which have found many applications beyond his original work.

== Early life and education ==
John Hubbard was born on October 27, 1931 to Charles and Marion Hubbard. He spent most of his childhood in Teddington, London, and lived with his parents through his university education.

Hubbard attended Hampton Grammar School and then entered Imperial College London. He received his Bachelor of Science in 1955, and his PhD in 1958 under the supervision of Stanley Raimes in the Department of Mathematics. For his thesis he worked on the “dielectric approach” to treating the Coulomb interaction between electrons in metals.

Immediately thereafter he was hired to work at the Atomic Energy Research Establishment, Harwell by Brian Flowers, who was at the time head of the Theoretical Physics Division.

== Career ==
=== Harwell ===
At Harwell, Hubbard’s first work was a series of three papers studying correlations in an electron gas via diagrammatic perturbation theory. Initially, Hubbard had been reluctant to write up his approach, explaining to Brian Flowers that other researchers had already addressed the same problem, via different although consistent methods. Nonetheless at Flowers’ urging Hubbard published, and J. R. Schrieffer has described the result as a “classic piece of work”.

Hubbard soon became the head of the Solid State Theory Group, in which capacity he spent most of his career. His main research was on the electronic and magnetic structure of metals, but he also made more applied contributions including to gaseous plasmas and isotope separation.

One of the interests of the theory group was interpreting neutron scattering data, available at Harwell as a byproduct of the multiple nuclear reactors. Hubbard noticed that the data for transition metals could be interpreted in terms of the Heisenberg model, in which electrons are localized. He realized that the localization behavior might be caused by correlations between electrons, and published a paper in 1963 introducing a simple model capturing these effects. The same model was independently published by Martin Gutzwiller and Junjiro Kanamori in the same year, but is known today as the Hubbard model.

Over the next four years, Hubbard continued to study the model, resulting in five further papers where he derived important results such as the existence of a transition between a Mott insulator and conductor. Walter Kohn described his contributions here as "the basis of much of our present thinking about the electronic structure of large classes of magnetic metals and insulators", and others have emphasized the importance of the techniques and insight Hubbard applied to the problem.

Over the next fifteen years, his interests shifted slightly, although he continued to prefer to study one topic over several years, often resulting in a series of articles. For instance, beginning in 1967 he wrote five papers on approximate band structure calculation, and in the early 1970s much of his research was on critical phenomena, following Ken Wilson’s seminal work.

While at Harwell he visited a number of American institutions, including a sabbatical at Berkeley (1958–1959), two summers at Brookhaven (1963 and 1969), and a semester at Brown University (Fall 1970). It was at Berkeley that he published a paper popularizing a method first derived by Ruslan Stratonovich for computing the partition function of many-body systems, now called the Hubbard–Stratonovich transformation.

=== IBM ===
Beginning in the late 1960s, Harwell confronted a decreasing need for nuclear power research, for which it had been originally designed, as the technology became more mature. Under the leadership of Walter Marshall, it began to take on a new role as a contract research organization for British industry, entailing a shift in personnel, especially away from basic atomic science research.

Following this major reform, Hubbard left Harwell in 1976 and joined the IBM Research Laboratory in San Jose, California. His major success in these years was his development in 1978 of a first-principles theory on the magnetism of iron and other metallic ferromagnets. This was a problem which had concerned him for much of his career; indeed, his 1963 work on the Hubbard model was initially aimed at resolving it, even if it did not end up providing a solution.

As at Harwell, he also made time for some more applied work, including on phase conjugate optics and neutral-to-ionic phase transitions.

== Personal life ==
Hubbard met his wife, Joan, at Harwell where they both worked. They married in August 1958 and had three children: Charles (b. 1961), Catherine (b. 1964), and Margaret (b. 1967). He died after a brief illness on November 27, 1980 in San Jose, survived by his wife and children.

He was described by coworkers as having a shy personality, as well as being a careful and exacting scientist and helpful collaborator.
