= Bosonic field =

Type of quantum field

In quantum field theory, a bosonic field is a quantum field whose quanta are bosons; that is, they obey Bose–Einstein statistics. Bosonic fields obey canonical commutation relations, as distinct from the canonical anticommutation relations obeyed by fermionic fields.

Examples include scalar fields, describing spin-0 particles such as the Higgs boson, and gauge fields, describing spin-1 particles such as the photon.

== Basic properties ==
Free (non-interacting) bosonic fields obey canonical commutation relations. Those relations also hold for interacting bosonic fields in the interaction picture, where the fields evolve in time as if free and the effects of the interaction are encoded in the evolution of the states. It is these commutation relations that imply Bose–Einstein statistics for the field quanta.

== Examples ==
Examples of bosonic fields include scalar fields, gauge fields, and symmetric 2-tensor fields, which are characterized by their covariance under Lorentz transformations and have spins 0, 1 and 2, respectively. Physical examples, in the same order, are the Higgs field, the photon field, and the graviton field. Of the last two, only the photon field can be quantized using the conventional methods of canonical or path integral quantization. This has led to the theory of quantum electrodynamics, one of the most successful theories in physics. Quantization of gravity, on the other hand, is a long-standing problem that has led to development of theories such as string theory and loop quantum gravity.

== Spin and statistics ==
The spin–statistics theorem implies that quantization of local, relativistic field theories in 3+1 dimensions may lead either to bosonic or fermionic quantum fields, i.e., fields obeying commutation or anti-commutation relations, according to whether they have integer or half-integer spin, respectively. Thus bosonic fields are one of the two theoretically possible types of quantum field, namely those corresponding to particles with integer spin.

In a non-relativistic many-body theory, the spin and the statistical properties of the quanta are not directly related. In fact, the commutation or anti-commutation relations are assumed based on whether the theory one intends to study corresponds to particles obeying Bose–Einstein or Fermi–Dirac statistics. In this context the spin remains an internal quantum number that is only phenomenologically related to the statistical properties of the quanta. Examples of non-relativistic bosonic fields include those describing cold bosonic atoms, such as Helium-4.

Such non-relativistic fields are not as fundamental as their relativistic counterparts: they provide a convenient 're-packaging' of the many-body wave function describing the state of the system, whereas the relativistic fields described above are a necessary consequence of the consistent union of relativity and quantum mechanics.

== See also ==
- Quantum triviality
- Composite field
- Auxiliary field
