= Hubbard–Stratonovich transformation =

Mathematical transformation used in polymer physics

The Hubbard–Stratonovich (HS) transformation is an exact mathematical transformation invented by Russian physicist Ruslan L. Stratonovich and popularized by British physicist John Hubbard. It is used to convert a particle theory into its respective field theory by linearizing the density operator in the many-body interaction term of the Hamiltonian and introducing an auxiliary scalar field $\phi.$ It is defined via the integral identity
$$\exp\left(-\frac{a}{2} x^2\right) =
\sqrt{\frac{1}{2\pi a}} \int_{-\infty}^\infty \mathrm{d}\phi \exp\left(-\frac{\phi^2}{2a} - ix\phi\right),$$
where the real constant $a > 0.$ For matrix-valued operators (see below for the meaning of individual terms and derivation), such as on-site electronic density operators,
$$\exp(-\rho_j V_{jk} \rho_k) = \int \operatorname{D}[\phi] \exp\left(-\frac{1}{4} \phi_j V_{jk}^{-1} \phi_k - i \phi_j \rho_j\right).$$

The basic idea of the HS transformation is to reformulate a system of particles interacting through two-body potentials into a system of independent particles interacting with a fluctuating field. The procedure is widely used in polymer physics, classical particle physics, spin-glass theory, electronic-structure theory and discrete modelling of nuclear physics such as nuclear lattice effective field theory (NLEFT).

== Derivation of the matrix version ==
Given an $N\times N$ matrix $A_{ij}$, the multi-dimensional Gaussian integral can be evaluated as (see here)
$$\int \mathrm{d}\phi_1\cdots\mathrm{d}\phi_N \exp\left(-\sum_{ij} \phi_i A_{ij} \phi_j \right) = \frac{\pi^{N/2}}{\sqrt{\operatorname{det} A}}.$$

We shall assume that $V_{mn}$ is a symmetric matrix. Then,
$$\exp\left(-\sum_{mn}\rho_m V_{mn} \rho_n\right) = \underbrace{ \frac{\sqrt{\operatorname{det} A}}{\pi^{N/2}} \int \mathrm{d}\phi_1\cdots\mathrm{d}\phi_N \exp\left(-\sum_{ij} \phi_i A_{ij} \phi_j \right) }_{=1} \exp\left(-\sum_{mn}\rho_m V_{mn} \rho_n\right),$$
since we have simply multiplied the expression by one. We now take $A=(1/4)V^{-1}$, where $V^{-1}$ is the inverse of $V$, and do the transformation $\phi_i \to \phi_i + 2i\sum_m V_{im}\rho_m$. This yields
$$\sum_{ij} \phi_i V^{-1}_{ij} \phi_j \to \sum_{ij}\phi_i V^{-1}_{ij} \phi_j + 4i \sum_k \rho_k \phi_k - 4\sum_{mn} \rho_m V_{mn} \rho_n.$$
The last term will cancel in the integral and we are left with
$$\frac{\sqrt{\operatorname{det} (V^{-1}/4)}}{\pi^{N/2}} \int \mathrm{d}\phi_1\cdots\mathrm{d}\phi_N \exp\left(-\frac{1}{4}\sum_{ij}\phi_i V^{-1}_{ij} \phi_j - i \sum_k \rho_k \phi_k \right).$$
The prefactor can be written as
$$\frac{1}{\sqrt{\operatorname{det} (4\pi V)}}$$
and we thus obtain the result above upon identifying
$$\operatorname{D}[\phi] = \frac{\mathrm{d}\phi_1\cdots\mathrm{d}\phi_N}{\sqrt{\operatorname{det} (4\pi V)}}.$$

== Calculation of resulting field theories ==
The resulting field theories are well-suited for the application of effective approximation techniques, like the mean-field approximation. A major difficulty arising in the simulation with such field theories is their highly oscillatory nature in case of strong interactions, which leads to the well-known numerical sign problem. The problem originates from the repulsive part of the interaction potential, which implicates the introduction of the complex factor via the HS transformation.

== See also ==
- Gaussian integral
