= Resonating valence bond theory =

Theoretical model for high-temperature superconductivity

In condensed matter physics, the resonating valence bond theory (RVB) is a theoretical model that attempts to describe high-temperature superconductivity, and in particular the superconductivity in cuprate compounds. It was proposed by P. W. Anderson and Ganapathy Baskaran in 1987. The theory states that in copper oxide lattices, electrons from neighboring copper atoms interact to form a valence bond, which locks them in place. However, with doping, these electrons can act as mobile Cooper pairs and are able to superconduct. Anderson observed in his 1987 paper that the origins of superconductivity in doped cuprates was in the Mott insulator nature of crystalline copper oxide. RVB builds on the Hubbard and t-J models used in the study of strongly correlated materials.

In 2014, evidence showing that fractional particles can happen in quasi two-dimensional magnetic materials, was found by EPFL scientists, lending support for Anderson's theory.

== Description ==
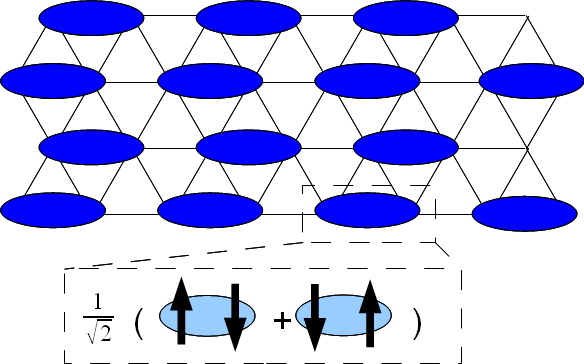
The RVB state with valence bond coupling of nearest-neighbor electrons.

The physics of Mott insulators is described by the repulsive Hubbard model Hamiltonian:

$$H=-t\sum_{\langle ij\rangle}(c^{\dagger}_{i\sigma}c_{j\sigma}+\text{h.c.})+U\sum_in_{i\uparrow}n_{i\downarrow}$$

In 1971, Anderson first suggested that this Hamiltonian can have a non-degenerate ground state that is composed of disordered spin states. Shortly after the high-temperature superconductors were discovered, Anderson and Kivelson et al. proposed a resonating valence bond ground state for these materials, written as

$$|\text{RVB}\rangle=\sum_C|C\rangle$$

where $C$ represented a covering of a lattice by nearest neighbor dimers. Each such covering is weighted equally. In a mean field approximation, the RVB state can be written in terms of a Gutzwiller projection, and displays a superconducting phase transition per the Kosterlitz–Thouless mechanism. However, a rigorous proof for the existence of a superconducting ground state in either the Hubbard or the t-J Hamiltonian is not yet known. Further the stability of the RVB ground state has not yet been confirmed.
