= List of fellows of the American Physical Society (1998–2010) =

The American Physical Society honors members with the designation Fellow for having made significant accomplishments to the field of physics.

The following list includes those fellows selected from 1998 through 2010.

== 1998 ==
- Gregory Scott Adkins
- Blas Rafael Alascio
- Mikhail Alexeevich Anisimov
- Howard Arthur Baer
- Razl Antonio Baragiola
- Klaus Richard Bartschat
- Nicolay G. Basov
- J. Georg Bednorz
- Michael J. Bedzyk
- Charles Henry Bennett (scientist)
- Beverly K. Berger
- Claude Bernard
- Peter Simon Bernard
- Martin Berz
- Jeffrey Bokor
- J. Richard Bond
- Roderick William Boswell
- Ivan Bozovic (scientist)
- Hans Albert Braun
- Warren Wesley Buck
- Stephen John Buckman
- Jack O'Neal Burns
- William J. Camp
- Roberto Car
- Joseph Allen Carlson
- Emily Ann Carter
- Lee Wendel Casperson
- Joan Mary Centrella
- James Chen
- R. Sekhar Chivukula
- Marek Cieplak
- Yachin Cohen
- Ralph H. Colby
- Rufus L. Cone
- Stephen Robert Cotanch
- Steven Charles Cowley
- Thomas Lynn Curtright
- James T. Cushing
- Luiz Barroca Da Silva
- Elbio Dagotto
- Werner J. A. Dahm
- Marie-Agnes D. Deleplanque
- Edward Della Torre
- Carleton Edward Detar
- Thomas Gregory Dewey
- Guy Dimonte
- Jacek Dobaczewski
- Ronald W. P. Drever
- Gerardo Giovanni Dutto
- William A. Eaton
- Norman Marvin Edelstein
- Paul John Ellis
- Robin F. C. Farrow
- Philippe M. Fauchet
- James Marshall Feagin
- Peter Mark Felker
- Matthew P. A. Fisher
- George William Foster
- Eduardo Hector Fradkin
- Joseph S. Francisco
- Alejandro Hoeflich Frank
- Gerald Timothy Fraser
- Glenn H. Fredrickson
- Eric Edward Fullerton
- Anthony F. Garito
- Stephen Garoff
- Morteza Gharib
- Walter Gilbert
- Sharon Gail Glendinning
- Steven Harvey Gold
- Vladimir Joseph Goldman
- Alfred T. Goshaw
- Kenneth E. Gray
- Joseph E. Greene
- Arunava Gupta
- Rajendra Gupta (scientist)
- J. Woods Halley
- Peter C. Hammel
- Herbert Aaron Hauptman
- Mark Douglas Havey
- Dan A. Hays
- Franz Ulrich Hillebrecht
- Gerald Wayne Hoffmann
- Neil C. Holmes
- Rush D. Holt
- John Huth
- Mustapha Ishak Boushaki
- Gerald Peter Jackson
- Juha M. Javanainen
- W. Neil Johnson
- Ieuan Rinallt Jones
- E. Leonard Jossem
- David B. Kaplan
- Richard Lloyd Kautz
- Vasudev Mangesh Kenkre
- Rajinder P. Khosla
- Klaus von Klitzing
- Donald L. Koch
- William John Kossler
- Michael T. Kotschenreuther
- Lawrence M. Krauss
- Jean Peck Krisch
- Arnold H. Kritz
- Sanat K. Kumar
- Anthony Ladd
- Rubin Harold Landau
- Robert Bettes Laughlin
- Francoise K. LeGoues
- Siu Au Lee
- Peter J. Limon
- Bai Xin Liu
- Kopin Liu
- Arthur Eugene Livingston
- Aneesh V. Manohar
- Charles Mathew Mate
- William Henry Matthaeus
- Jabez Jenkins McClelland
- Patrick L. McGaughey
- Charles Meneveau
- Bernard S. Meyerson
- Mario J. Molina
- Robert D. Moser
- George H. Neilson
- Ann E. Nelson
- Andrew Ng
- Gerd Ulrich Nienhaus
- Yoshitsugu Oono
- Paul C. Painter
- Anthony Edward Perry
- John C. Polanyi
- Ronald A. Poling
- Wayne Nicholas Polyzou
- George Edward Possin
- Daryl W. Preston
- Ivan David Proctor
- Talat Shahnaz Rahman
- Karl Ernst Rehm
- John S. Rigden
- Donald S. Rimai
- Thomas Ralph Rizzo
- Robert Alan Robinson
- Harvey A. Rose
- James Benjamin Rosenzweig
- Roy Rubinstein
- Alessandro G. Ruggiero
- Dmitri D. Ryutov
- Kazimierz Rzążewski
- George Anthony Sai-Halasz
- Brian Craig Sales
- Antoine Beno Salin
- James Avery Sauls
- Matthias Scheffler
- John Frederic Schenck
- Arnold J. Schmidt
- David M. Schrader
- Bernard Fredrick Schutz
- Harry Alan Schwettman
- Steven Douglas Scott
- Joseph W. Serene
- Qaisar Shafi
- Benjamin Victor Shanabrook
- Stuart Louis Shapiro
- Bradley Marc Sherrill
- Abner Shimony
- Boris I. Shraiman
- Henry Wayne Sobel
- Paul E. Sokol
- Paul Souder
- Peter Wesley Stephens
- Donald Scott Stewart
- Morris L. Swartz
- Ching W. Tang
- Carlos Tejedor De Paz
- Jon J. Thaler
- Friedrich K. Thielemann
- Valerie Thomas
- Gary George Tibbetts
- Antonio C. Ting
- Sandip Tiwari
- Werner Tornow
- Claudia Megan Urry
- Oriol Tomas Valls
- Valerii M. Vinokur
- Jogindra Mohan Wadehra
- Herbert Walther
- Bennie Franklin Leon Ward
- Margaret Horton Weiler
- Peter Weinberger
- Robert A. Weiss
- Roy N. West
- Carter T. White
- Steven R. White
- Michael C. F. Wiescher
- Kenneth G. Wilson
- Peter Winkler
- Krzysztof Wodkiewicz
- David S. Wollan
- Laurence G. Yaffe
- Guozhen Yang
- Arjun Gaurang Yodh
- John Yoh
- Jian-Min Yuan
- Anton Zeilinger
- Zhenyu Zhang
- William Zimmerman
- Jan Leonard van Hemmen

== 1999 ==
- Barbara Abraham-Shrauner
- James Paul Alexander
- Ani Aprahamian
- John Patrick Apruzese
- Thomas Banks
- Herbert Bradford Barber
- Norman Charles Bartelt
- Giorgio Bellettini
- Charles L. Bennett
- Thomas James Bernatowicz
- Nora Berrah
- Johann (Gianni) W. Blatter
- John Russell Brandenberger
- Charles A. Brau
- Igor Bray
- Aviva Brecher
- William Howard Breckenridge
- Raymond Brock (physicist)
- James S. Brooks
- Robert William Brown
- Gregory Harger Canavan
- Arthur E. Champagne
- Hudong Chen
- David C. Cheng
- Rob Duncan Coalson
- William Thomas Coffey
- Robert S. Cohen
- Peter John Collings
- James Joseph Collins
- Roy Kent Crawford
- Christopher Deeney
- Charles Dennison Dermer
- David P. DiVincenzo
- Renee Diehl
- Michael C. Downer
- James Henry Duncan
- Michael I. Eides
- Said E. Elghobashi
- Yasuo Endoh
- Jeffrey J. Folkins
- John L. Friedman
- Amnon Fruchtman
- Paul Henry Fuoss
- Peter Louis Galison
- Mary E. Galvin
- Umesh Garg
- Bruce C. Garrett
- Christoph Emanuel Gerber
- Gary Earle Gladding
- Leon Glass
- Alan Herbert Glasser
- Marcelo Gleiser
- Marvin Goldberg
- Alan Ira Goldman
- Jack Terrance Goldman
- Daniel M. Greenberger
- Karl Ontjes Groeneveld
- Donald E. Groom
- Olle R. L. Gunnarsson
- Bruce Alvin Gurney
- Sharon Lee Hagopian
- Michael Hass
- William M. Haynes
- James Richard Heath
- Daniel J. Heinzen
- John William Hepburn
- Eric Herbst
- Alan Van Heuvelen
- Wendell Talbot Hill
- Steven Paul Hirshman
- Tin-Lun Ho
- Ingo Hofmann
- Richard J. Hughes
- Earle R. Hunt
- Gene Emery Ice
- Carlo Jacoboni
- Purusottam Jena
- Mark A. Johnson
- Michael E. Jones
- Hellmut Keiter
- Edward J. Kerschen
- Ernest G. Kessler
- Michael Hannam Key
- Yoshitaka Kimura
- Larry Dale Kirkpatrick
- Vladimir G. Kogan
- Julia A. Kornfield
- Chryssa Kouveliotou
- Sergei I. Krasheninnikov
- Jacqueline Krim
- Andrew H. C. Kung
- Juergen Kurths
- Wai-Kwong Kwok
- Karl Lackner
- Ying-Cheng Lai
- Jean-Pierre Leburton
- Yuan-Pern Lee
- Michael Edward Levi
- Stephen Bernard Libby
- Tony Michael Liss
- Christopher J. Lister
- Chun-Keung Loong
- Ramon E. Lopez
- Sherwin T. Love
- James E. Lukens
- Joseph David Lykken
- Claude M. Lyneis
- Norman David Malmuth
- Alfred Paul Marchetti
- Richard F. Martin
- Michio Matsuzawa
- Michael John Mehl
- Ronald Elbert Mickens
- Albert Migliori
- Michael J. Miksis
- Robert Lynn Miller
- Andrew J. Millis
- Peter A. Mirau
- William Charles Mitchel
- Elisa Molinari
- Alfred Z. Msezane
- Alfred Miller
- Yorikiyo Nagashima
- David Vincent Neuffer
- Riley D. Newman
- Qian Niu
- Eric B. Norman
- Arthur Jack Nozik
- Octavio Jose Obregon
- Benjamin Mark Ocko
- William T. Oosterhuis
- Luis A. Orozco
- Frank James Owens
- Emilio Panarella
- Mark R. Pederson
- Seppo Ilmari Penttila
- Robert James Perry
- Peter M. Pfeifer
- Pierre Pillet
- Valery Pokrovsky
- L. Ramdas Ram-Mohan
- Jorgen Randrup
- J. Thomas Ratchford
- Sidney Redner
- Kennedy J. Reed
- Michael Riordan
- Mark Owen Robbins
- Roger W. Rollins
- Leslie J. Rosenberg
- Michael D. Rosenthal
- Michael Lee Roukes
- David L. Rubin
- John Loren Safko
- Heidi Marie Schellman
- David Paul Schissel
- Wolfgang Peter Schleich
- Mansour Shayegan
- Marc Taylor Sher
- Fujio Shimizu (scientist)
- Frederick N. Skiff
- Alexander N. Skrinsky
- Milton Dean Slaughter
- Todd I. Smith
- Paul M. Solomon
- Rafael Dolnick Sorkin
- Sumner Grosby Starrfield
- George I. Stegeman
- Daniel L. Stein
- David P. Stern
- Christopher Stubbs
- Sauro Fausto Succi
- Peter Taborek
- Beverley Taylor
- Patricia A. Thiel
- Jan Tobochnik
- Akira Tonomura
- John M. Torkelson
- Hans Peter Trommsdorff
- Yasutomo J. Uemura
- Turgay Uzer
- Priya Vashishta
- Luis Vina
- Harold J. Vinegar
- Arthur B.C. Walker
- Thad Gilbert Walker
- Fred L. Walls
- Zellman Warhaft
- Su-Huai Wei
- Patrick Dan Weidman
- Gary D. Westfall
- Albert Dewell Wheelon
- David H. Whittum
- Donald Ray Wiff
- Robert L. Willett
- Kent R. Wilson
- Robert B. Wiringa
- Colin E. C. Wood
- William Kent Wootters
- Chi Wu
- William B. Yelon
- Kenneth Young
- Linda Young
- Peter Eric Young
- Alexander B. Zamolodchikov
- Dieter Zeppenfeld
- Alex Zettl
- Fu Chun Zhang
- Alex Zunger
- Robert Bruce van Dover

== 2000 ==
- Richard K. Ahrenkiel
- Spiros H. Anastasiadis
- Dana Zachery Anderson
- Elena Aprile
- Meigan Charlotte Aronson
- Samuel Harry Aronson
- Raymond Dean Astumian
- Gordon J. Aubrecht
- Priscilla S. Auchincloss
- Kim K. Baldridge
- Nitash P. Balsara
- Glenn Bateman (scientist)
- James Douglas Beason
- Mark Alan Berg
- Rainer Blatt
- Geoffrey Thomas Bodwin
- Bruce Michael Boghosian
- Eric Alan Braaten
- James Edward Brau
- Stanley G. Brown
- Lev Naumovich Bulaevskii
- Allen C. Caldwell
- Robert Craig Cauble
- Michael John Cavagnero
- Francis Edward Cecil
- James Cederberg
- Albert M. Chang
- Yia-Chung Chang
- Sang-Wook Cheong
- Lalit Chandra Chhabildas
- Yanglai Cho
- Kwong Kit Choi
- Michael Coey
- James J. Coleman
- Piers Coleman
- Robert E. Continetti
- Sam R. Coriell
- R. Stephen Craxton
- Nar S. Dalal
- Murray S. Daw
- Carl Richard DeVore
- Stanley Roderick Deans
- Barney L. Doyle
- Jerry Paul Draayer
- Peter David Drummond
- Jerome Lewis Duggan
- Mark Andrew Edwards
- Vitaly Efimov
- Takeshi Egami
- Mostafa A. El-Sayed
- Victor Valentine Eremenko
- Uri Feldman
- Stephen M. Foiles
- Mohamed Gad-el-Hak
- Paul Ginsparg
- Efim Gluskin
- Joseph Grover Gordon
- Mark S. Gordon
- Martin J. Greenwald
- Ulrich Michael Gösele
- David Glen Haase
- James Henry Hammer
- Beverly Karplus Hartline
- David William Hertzog
- James Hough
- Ke-Chiang Hsieh
- Yee Bob Hsiung
- James (Casey) T. Hynes
- Sumio Iijima
- Eric D. Isaacs
- James Allen Isenberg
- Howard E. Jackson
- Ralph Boyd James
- Roderick V. Jensen
- Xiangdong Ji
- Peter Lauson Jolivette
- Robert Rivers Jones
- Bruce David Kay
- John W. Keto
- Murtadha A. Khakoo
- Kay Kinoshita
- Gabriel Kotliar
- Anne Jacob Kox
- Martha Krebs
- Prem Kumar
- Shin-ichi Kurokawa
- Andrew J. Lankford
- Juan C. Lasheras
- James Michael Lattimer
- Michael J. Leitch
- Kevin Thomas Lesko
- Nigel Stuart Lockyer
- David John Lohse
- Daniel Loss
- Philip I. Lubin
- Mark Steven Lundstrom
- Zaida Ann Luthey-Schulten
- Ruprecht Machleidt
- Mohamad Ali Mahdavi
- M. Cristina Marchetti
- Robert Alfred Meger
- Ferenc Mezei
- John Wallace Mintmire
- Jagadeesh Subbaiah Moodera
- Raymond D. Mountain
- Margaret Mary Murname
- Stephen Eric Nagler
- Tai-Kai Ng
- Joseph Nilsen
- Dennis L. Nordstrom
- Mark Alan Novotny
- Gregory Semeon Nusinovich
- Patrick G. O'Shea
- Ann E. Orel
- Burt Ovrut
- Javier Tejada Palacios
- Saul Perlmutter
- Goran Pichler
- Robert D. Pisarski
- David William Piston
- Pedro Antonio Prieto
- Serban Protopopescu
- Dierk Rainer
- Michael Jeffrey Ramsey-Musolf
- Tor O. Raubenheimer
- Linda Elizabeth Reichl
- Stephen P. Reynolds
- Mark Anthony Riley
- Hans Georg Ritter
- Marlene Rosenberg
- Thomas D. Rossing
- Rajarshi Roy
- Wojciech Rozmus
- Michael Rubinstein
- Hiroyuki Sakaki
- Dominique Salin
- James R. Sanford
- Thomas W. L. Sanford
- Otto F. Sankey
- Demetrios G. Sarantites
- Sushil K. Satija
- Sashi Sekhar Satpathy
- Omer Savas
- James Stanford Schilling
- David R. Schultz
- Robert A. Scranton
- Lynn Seaman
- Mordechai Segev
- Eric Stefan G. Shaqfeh
- Junko Shigemitsu
- William Sirignano
- Tomasz Skwarnicki
- Darryl Lyle Smith
- Mark L. Spano
- Robert James Spry
- Edmund J. Synakowski
- Krzysztof Szalewicz
- Hideaki Takabe
- Michio Takami
- Maria C. Tamargo
- Michael Alan Tamor
- Stephen Lewis Teitel
- Javier Tejada
- John H. Thomas
- Chin-Sen Ting
- Harry W. K. Tom
- David S. Y. Tong
- Yoji Totsuka
- Gretar Tryggvason
- Jaw-Shen Tsai
- Alexander V. Turbiner
- Raymond Clyde Turner
- William G. Unruh
- John Bos Van Zytveld
- Albert Anthony Viggiano
- Galileo Violini
- Ian A. Walmsley
- Sean Washburn
- Daniel Weihs
- David Hal Weinberg
- James C. Weisshaar
- Dieter Weller
- Gene L. Wells
- Ulrich Welp
- Colm Thomas Whelan
- Kurt Arn Wiesenfeld
- Gwyn Philip Williams
- Alan H. Windle
- Peter Stanley Winokur
- James E. Wiss
- Po-Zen Wong
- David Roy Yarkony
- Arie Zigler
- Michael S. Zisman
- Timothy Scott Zwier
- Robert Raimond de Ruyter van Steven

== 2001 ==
- Carl Albright
- Yoram Alhassid
- Francois Anderegg
- Igor Samuel Aronson
- Robert S. Averback
- Terry Clayton Awes
- Birger Bo Back
- Rama Bansil
- Ruben Gerardo Barrera
- Pierre Baruch
- Donald R. Beck
- Peter Beiersdorfer
- Elizabeth J. Beise
- Ali Belkacem
- Paul Benioff
- David Nathan Beratan
- Donald Stimson Bethune
- Riccardo Betti
- Robert Bingham
- Ferdinando Borsa
- Robert William Boyd
- Robert H. Brandenberger
- Boris N. Breizman
- Patricia R. Burchat
- Juan Carlos Campuzano
- Paul C. Canfield
- Francesco Cerrina
- Jean-Marc Chomaz
- Thomas David Cohen
- William Boniface Colson
- Mirjam Cvetič
- Jill P. Dahlburg
- Dattatraya Purushottam Dandekar
- Thomas Alan DeGrand
- Rashmi C. Desai
- David A. Dixon
- Charles R. Doering
- John Morrissey Doyle
- Henry van Driel
- Michael Ansel Duncan
- Mark I. Dykman
- Henry Frederick Dylla
- Lester Fuess Eastman
- Lewis S. Edelheit
- Alexander Lev Efros
- Charlotte Elster
- Laurie A. Fathe
- Herbert A. Fertig
- Ephraim Fischbach
- Daniel Mark Fleetwood
- Thomas Harrison Foster
- Alfonso Franciosi
- Hans-Joachim Freund
- James G. Fujimoto
- Richard J. Furnstahl
- Ashok J. Gadgil
- Stephen Geer
- David W. Gidley
- Siegfried H. Glenzer
- Paul Mark Goldbart
- Isaac Goldhirsch
- Mark Goodman
- John A. Goree
- Kim Griest
- J. Raul Grigera
- Lisbeth Dagmar Gronlund
- Philippe Guyot-Sionnest
- Carl Haber
- George C. Hadjipanayis
- Naomi J. Halas
- Robert Haag Heffner
- Paul A Heiney
- Ulrich Walter Heinz
- Karl R Helfrich
- Michael Frederick Herman
- Gary T. Horowitz
- Julia W.P. Hsu
- Bei-Lok Hu
- Mark S. Hybertsen
- Ciriyam Jayaprakash
- Randall David Kamien
- Eli Kapon
- Henry Cornelius Kapteyn
- Anne Myers Kelley
- Alan Robert Kerstein
- Margaret Galland Kivelson
- Teunis Martien Klapwijk
- Edgar Knobloch
- Geoffrey Arthur Krafft
- Serdar Kuyucak
- Paul Gregory Kwiat
- Christine Labaune
- Nghi Quoc Lam
- Andrew E. Lange
- M. Howard Lee
- Timothy Joseph Lee
- Wim Pieter Leemans
- Sanjiva Keshava Lele
- Zachary Howard Levine
- Fred M. Levinton
- Brenton Raymond Lewis
- Amable Linan
- James Michael Lisy
- Byron Gene Lundberg
- Nancy Makri
- John H. Marburger
- Laurence Daniel Marks
- John B. McClelland
- Geoffrey B. McFadden
- Peter Mastin McIntyre
- Laurie Elizabeth McNeil
- Bernhard Alfred Mecking
- Eugene J. Mele
- Jerry Richard Meyer
- John F. Mitchell
- Guenakh Mitselmakher
- Donald Paul Monroe
- David H. Munro
- Margaret Mary Murnane
- George R. Neil
- Herbert Neuberger
- Michael Lester Norman
- Jan Oitmaa
- Angela Villela Olinto
- Monica Olvera de la Cruz
- Christopher J. Palmstrom
- Stephen G. Peggs
- Michael H. Peters
- Philip A. Pincus
- Madappa Prakash
- Ashok Puri
- Krishnan Raghavachari
- Regina Abby Rameika
- Ramamoorthy Ramesh
- Dennis Chaim Rapaport
- Richard A. Register
- John J. Rehr
- Shang-Fen Ren
- Julia Elizabeth Rice
- Hermann Riecke
- Per Arne Rikvold
- Craig Darrian Roberts
- Francis J. Robicheaux
- Natalie Ann Roe
- Frances Mary Ross
- Randal Charles Ruchti
- Subir Sachdev
- Robert J. Scherrer
- Kevin Edward Schmidt
- E. Fred Schubert
- Tamar Seideman
- Abhijit Sen
- Sergei F. Shandarin
- Ramamurti Shankar
- David H. Shoemaker
- Padma Kant Shukla
- Eric B Sirota
- Francis Slakey
- Gregory Scott Smith
- Amarjit Soni
- Masaki Suenaga
- Simon Patrick Swordy
- Xerxes Ramyar Tata
- Antoinette Jane Taylor
- Bruce David Terris
- Peter John Osmond Teubner
- Paul L Tipton
- Erio Tosatti
- John R Tucker
- Philip Michael Tuts
- Boyd William Veal
- John D. Vergados
- Ethan T. Vishniac
- David George Walmsley
- Ronald Lee Walsworth
- Zhen-Gang Wang
- Eicke Weber
- Howard Henry Wieman
- Carl J. Williams
- James Randall Wilson
- Ned S. Wingreen
- Ruqian Wu
- Arun Yethiraj
- Lloyd Martin Young
- Shengbai Zhang
- Bing Zhou
- Paul William Zitzewitz
- Cornelius William de Jager
- Marcellinus P. M. den Nijs
- Karl Albert van Bibber

== 2002 ==
- Ian Keith Affleck
- Ramesh K. Agarwal
- Steven W. Barwick
- Frank George Baskerville-Bridges
- Douglas H. Beck
- Itzik Ben-Itzhak
- Stephen G. Benka
- Stephen Vincent Benson
- Gennady P. Berman
- Robert William Bilger
- Julie Ann Borchers
- Gerry M. Bunce
- Laurie Jeanne Butler
- Marcela Carena
- Yu-Jiuan Chen
- Mei-Yin Chou
- W. Gilbert Clark
- David C. Clary
- Ronald Elliott Cohen
- Daniel R. Cohn
- Michael E. Coltrin
- Russell J. Composto
- Janet Marie Conrad
- Mark S. Conradi
- Matthew Warren Copel
- Denis Cubaynes
- Ashok Kumar Das
- Paul Brett Davies
- Brett David DePaola
- Paul Timothy Debevec
- J. Thomas Dickinson
- Peter John Doe
- Alan Thomas Dorsey
- Roberto Derat Escudero
- James William Evans
- Adam Frederick Falk
- Steven Robert Federman
- Lee Samuel Finn
- Ralph Bruno Fiorito
- Vladimir E. Fortov
- John T. Fourkas
- Carl Albert Gagliardi
- Richard S. Galik
- Kenneth Franklin Galloway
- Daniel Gammon
- Daniel Joseph Gauthier
- Raymond E. Goldstein
- Rainer Grobe
- James Bernard Grotberg
- Martin Gruebele
- Karl A. Gschneidner
- Gerald M. Hale
- Philip W. Hammer
- P. Gregers Hansen
- Christopher J. Hardy
- Walter Newbold Hardy
- Vincent G. Harris
- Robert James Hastie
- Anna C. Hayes
- Alan Hibbert
- John Peter Hill
- David Alan Hoagland
- Brad Lee Holian
- Benjamin S. Hsiao
- John Howard Hubbell
- Robert Hull
- Julian C.R. Hunt
- Atac Imamoglu
- Alan Jackson
- Donald T. Jacobs
- Heinrich Martin Jaeger
- HongWen Jiang
- Sajeev John
- Barbara A. Jones
- Chang Kee Jung
- Harris P. Kagan
- Morton R. Kagan
- Antoine Kahn
- James H. Kaufman
- Stanley Martin Kaye
- Lawrence A. Kennedy
- Donald M. Kerr
- Alexei M. Khokhlov
- Masatoshi Koshiba
- Jeffrey L. Krause
- Andreas S. Kronfeld
- Susan Takacs Krueger
- Mark Howard Kryder
- Gershon Kurizki
- Walter R.L. Lambrecht
- Otto Lamotte Landen
- Barbara F. Lasinski
- Irving A. Lerch
- George N. Lewis
- Shawn-Yu Lin
- Lee A. Lindblom
- Dennis W. Lindle
- Bruce Lipschultz
- Detlef Lohse
- Richard V. E. Lovelace
- Peter B. Lyons
- Efstratios Manousakis
- Sumitendra Mazumdar
- Andrew K. McMahan
- Margaret A. Norris McMahan
- Fulvio Melia
- Robert Louis Merlino
- David Dietrich Meyerhofer
- Peter Daniel Meyers
- Stephen Val Milton
- Nikolai V. Mokhov
- Adriana Moreo
- Robert Alan Morris
- Gilbert Maker Nathanson
- David D. Nolte
- Peter Nordlander
- Franco Nori
- Marjorie Ann Olmstead
- Thomas Michael Orlando
- Louis M. Pecora
- Charles F. Perdrisat
- Hrvoje Petek
- Philip W. Phillips
- Ugo Piomelli
- Fernando A. Ponce
- Itamar Procaccia
- Donald Prosnitz
- Harrison Bertrand Prosper
- Jorge Pullin
- Karin M. Rabe
- Blair Norman Ratcliff
- Bharat Ratra
- Mark Arthur Reed
- Carlos O. Reinhold
- Achim Richter
- Forrest James Rogers
- Erich Sackmann
- Martin John Savage
- Guy Savard
- Rocco Schiavilla
- Gustavo E. Scuseria
- John Dasho Sethian
- Vladimir M. Shalaev
- Ian Peter Joseph Shipsey
- Kenneth R. Shull
- Elizabeth H. Simmons
- Jerry Alvon Simmons
- Kenneth David Singer
- John Edward Sipe
- David John Smith
- Pierre Sokolsky
- Linda Siobhan Sparke
- Boris Z. Spivak
- Peter Christian Stangeby
- Fredrick M. Stein
- Joseph Anthony Stroscio
- Ephraim Suhir
- Brian S. Swartzentruber
- Louis Taillefer
- Carol Elizabeth Tanner
- Cyrus Cooper Taylor
- Thomas Thundat
- Alexei Mikhail Tsvelik
- Leonid Tsybeskov
- Charles Wuching Tu
- Laurette Stephanie Tuckerman
- Jack Tueller
- Alan D. Turnbull
- Tanmay Vachaspati
- John A. Venables
- Leposava Vuskovic
- Xin-Nian Wang
- Thomas Joseph Weiler
- Michael Theodor Alfred Weinert
- Paul Storch Weiss
- Frederick Charles Wellstood
- Xiao-Gang Wen
- K. Birgitta Whaley
- Stanley E. Whitcomb
- Anthony G. Williams
- Forman A. Williams
- Herbert Graves Winful
- Thomas G. Winter
- Gerald Lee Witt
- William John Womersley
- Craig L. Woody
- David C. Wright
- Shin Nan Yang
- Mohana Yethiraj
- Xi-Cheng Zhang
- Robert M. Ziff
- Tomas Diaz de la Rubia

== 2003 ==
- Chris Edward Adolphsen
- Yefim Aglitskiy
- Ricardo Alarcón
- Richard J. Anderson
- Eva Y. Andrei
- Hartmuth Arenhoevel
- Alexander Vasilievich Balatsky
- Albert-László Barabási
- Ted Barnes
- Wolfgang W. Bauer
- David Peter Belanger
- Daniel ben-Avraham
- Peter A. Bennett
- Herbert J. Bernstein
- Robert M. Biefeld
- Norman Owen Birge
- Reinhold Blumel
- Eberhard Bodenschatz
- John L. Bohn (scientist)
- Douglas Bonn
- Timothy Howard Boyer
- Aleksander Ignace Braginski
- Thomas E. Browder
- David L. Brower
- Stuart E. Brown
- Wesley R. Burghardt
- Joe Charles Campbell
- John Irvin Castor
- Antonio H. Castro Neto
- Roy William Chantrell
- Matthew William Choptuik
- Demetrios N. Christodoulides
- Shun Lien Chuang
- Andrey V. Chubukov
- Juan Ignacio Cirac
- Andrew G. Cohen
- Stephen Lance Cooper
- Michael Cowperthwaite
- P. Daniel Dapkus
- Mukunda Prasad Das
- N. Anne Davies
- David Spencer DeYoung
- Jean Roger Delayen
- Morton Mace Denn
- Gerald Francis Dionne
- William Ditto
- Scott Dodelson
- Gary Dean Doolen
- Israel Dostrovsky
- John Derek Dowell
- David Alan Drabold
- Rui Rui Du
- Russell D. Dupuis
- Paul J. Emma
- Chang-Beom Eom
- Gregory Lawrence Eyink
- Gerard M. Faeth
- Thomas Lee Ferrell
- Jörg Fink
- Richard Fitzpatrick
- Christopher John Foot
- Stefan Gottfried Frauendorf
- Jean H. Futrell
- Charles Gale
- Giulia Galli
- Shubhra Mukerjee Gangopadhyay
- Laura Justine Garwin
- Ronald Gilman
- Vitaly L. Ginzburg
- James L. Gole
- Allan Griffin
- Leopold Ernst Halpern
- Thomas C. Halsey
- Tao Han
- Francis Harvey Harlow
- Stephen P. Hatchett
- Walter Alexander de Heer
- Chris C. Hegna
- Jack G. Hehn
- Eric A. Hessels
- Robert C. Hilborn
- John C. Hill
- Andrew Hime
- E. John Hinch
- Murray John Holland
- Leo William Hollberg
- Mihaly Horanyi
- Chia-Ren Hu
- Amanda Eileen Hubbard
- Woei-Yann Pauchy Hwang
- Paul Indelicato
- Kenneth Intriligator
- Jacob Nissim Israelachvili
- Chennupati Jagadish
- Samson A. Jenekhe
- Deborah Shiu-Lan Jin
- Sungho Jin
- Duane Douglas Johnson
- Mark Brian Johnson
- Alun Denry Wynn Jones
- Robert Edwin Jones
- Berend Thomas Jonker
- Robert Kaita
- Richard D. Kass
- Efthimios Kaxiras
- Young-Kee Kim
- Paul Marvin Kintner
- Jacob Klein
- Richard I. Klein
- Victor I. Klimov
- Alexei Evgenievich Koshelev
- Robert J. La Haye
- Priscilla W. Laws
- John W. Layman
- Robert J. Lempert
- Hai Qing Lin
- Paul Frederick Linden
- Michael Annan Lisa
- Vladimir N. Litvinenko
- Jia-ming Liu
- Andre Longtin
- William C. Louis
- Anupam Madhukar
- David G. Madland
- Christian Mailhiot
- Fabio Marchesoni
- Anne M. Mayes
- Duncan Eldridge McBride
- Paul L. McEuen
- David Paul McGinnis
- Rodney A. McKee
- Yigal Meir
- Gregory P. Meisner
- Bradley Stewart Meyer
- Stephan S. Meyer
- Scott Thomas Milner
- Partha Pratim Mitra
- Henry Keith Moffatt
- Peter Moller
- Hitoshi Murayama
- Edmund Gregory Myers
- Ron Naaman
- Michael J. Naughton
- Philip C. Nelson
- Vitali Fedorovich Nesterenko
- Jens K. Norskov
- Ismail Cevdet Noyan
- Keith A. Olive
- Rene A. Ong
- Erich Ormand
- Alexander Z. Patashinski
- J. Ritchie Patterson
- Richard D. Petrasso
- Erwin David Poliakoff
- Neil Pomphrey
- Mara Goff Prentiss
- Phillip Nicholas Price
- Leo Radzihovsky
- Lisa Randall
- Helen Louise Reed
- Jack L. Ritchie
- Richard W. Robinett
- Nitin Samarth
- Gary Hilton Sanders
- Peter R. Saulson
- George Albert Sawatzky
- Kenneth Joseph Schafer
- Norbert F. Scherer
- Ilme Schlichting
- Darrell G. Schlom
- Reinhold Hans Schuch
- David Winston Schwenke
- Toshimori Sekine
- Jeffrey H. Shapiro
- Zhi-Xun Shen
- Stephen H. Shenker
- Bruce Arne Sherwood
- John Douglas Simon
- Pekka Kalervo Sinervo
- Surendra P. Singh
- Mano Singham
- Frieda Axelrod Stahl
- Kenneth Graham Standing
- Christopher J. Stanton
- Howard A. Stone
- James B. Strait
- Raman Sundrum
- Kunio Takayanagi
- Kazuo A. Tanaka
- Elias Towe
- Carlos L. Trallero-Giner
- Michael C. Tringides
- Ram K. Tripathi
- Gerrit van der Laan
- Jay Wallace Van Orden
- P. James Viccaro
- Jochen Wambach
- Stephen Michael Wandzura
- Lai-Sheng Wang
- Robert Oliver Watts
- John P. Wefel
- Jie Wei
- Bruce Warren Wessels
- John S. Wettlaufer
- Pavel Wiegmann
- Gary Allen Williams
- Philip Karl Williams
- Charles H. K. Williamson
- Karen Irene Winey
- Jeffrey Winicour
- Mark Brian Wise
- John Curtis Wright
- Aihua Xie
- Weitao Yang
- James A. Yorke

== 2004 ==
- Nigel Graham Adams
- Marcelo Alonso
- David Andelman
- Natan Andrei
- Dmetri V Averin
- Paul A. Avery
- Yshai Avishai
- Christina Allyssa Back
- Andrew Robert Baden
- James Edward Bailey
- Robert Allen Bartynski
- Robert John Beichner
- Gregory Benford
- Herbert Stanton Bennett
- Bernd A. Berg
- Zvi Bern
- Robert Howard Bernstein
- Nicholas P. Bigelow
- Ikaros I Bigi
- Dieter H Bimberg
- Raymond Francis Bishop
- Daniela Bortoletto
- Robert W. Bower
- Mark John Bowick
- Michael Brenner
- Joseph Warren Brill
- Collin Leslie Broholm
- J. Michael Brown
- Ramesh Chandra Budhani
- Adi Bulsara
- Matthias Burkardt
- Volker Dietmar Burkert
- J David Carlson
- John Lennart Carlsten
- Richard Roy Cavanagh
- Carlton M. Caves
- Marshall Robert Cleland
- Robert Edward Cohen
- Peter Semler Cooper
- Hans Juergen Coufal
- Harold G Craighead
- Roman Czujko
- David Jarvis Dean
- James H. Degnan
- Clarence Forbes Dewey
- Ulrike Diebold
- Malgorzata Dobrowolska
- Peter Arnold Dowben
- Rainer Andreas Dressler
- Douglas Jack Durian
- David J. Eaglesham
- Bruno Eckhardt
- Robert S. Eisenberg
- Steven Ray Elliott
- Henning Esbensen
- William E. Evenson
- Harindra Joseph Fernando
- Galen B. Fisher
- Lawrence H Ford
- George Fytas
- Paul Roesel Garabedian
- Julio Gea-Banacloche
- Robert D. Gehrz
- Graciela Beatriz Gelmini
- David Gershoni
- Bruce Gibbard
- John Dale Gillaspy
- Phillip R. Goode
- Alexander Yu Grosberg
- Godfrey Anthony Gumbs
- Hong Guo
- Alexander Lowe Harris
- Frank E. Harris
- Kenneth Charles Hass
- Jacqueline N. Hewitt
- Kenneth H. Hicks
- Peter Joseph Hirschfeld
- Stephen Holloway
- Howard Richard Huff
- Herbert E. Huppert
- Zahid Hussain
- Theodore Jacobson
- Abolhassan Jawahery
- Hantao Ji
- Robert Joynt
- Peter Jung
- Toshitaka Kajino
- Ann Renee Karagozian
- Alamgir Karim
- George Em Karniadakis
- Kenneth Franklin Kelton
- Anatoli S. Kheifets
- Robert Francis Kiefl
- Heinz-Jurgen Kluge
- Katrin Kneipp
- Mark Elwood Koepke
- V. Alan Kostelecky
- Predrag S. Krstic
- Sergey Lebedev
- Ting-Kuo Lee
- Arlene Judith Lennox
- Maciej Lewenstein
- Ralph Linsker
- Jane E.G. Lipson
- Andrea Jo-Wei Liu
- Hui Chun Liu
- Chih-Yuan Lu
- Timothy C. Luce
- Bengt I. Lundqvist
- Corinne Alison Manogue
- Marvin Lloyd Marshak
- Nicholas Leon Semple Martin
- Igor Ilich Mazin
- Roger McWilliams
- Curtis A. Meyer
- Zein-Eddine Meziani
- Anthony Mezzacappa
- James Angus Miller
- Umar Mohideen
- Mary Beth Todd Monroe
- David Scott Montgomery
- David Steven Moore
- Donald T. Morelli
- Michael David Morse
- Fredrick Iver Olness
- Kenju Otsuka
- Serge Yurievich Ovchinnikov
- Ho Jung Paik
- Jeevak Mahmud Parpia
- Robert Edwin Peterkin
- Richard W. Peterson
- Lal Ariyaratna Pinnaduwage
- Stephen S. Pinsky
- Annick Pouquet
- John C. Price
- Krishna Rajagopal
- Manijeh Razeghi
- Zhifeng Ren
- David H. Rice
- Leonid Rivkin
- Scott H. Robertson
- Thomas Dale Rognlien
- William Melvyn Roquemore
- Caroline Anne Ross
- Angel Rubio
- Czeslaw Zygmunt Rudowicz
- John Belting Rundle
- Victor Ryzhii
- Hossein Roshani Sadeghpour
- Richard T. Scalettar
- Peter Ernest Schiffer
- Beate Schmittmann
- Michael P. Schulz
- Benjamin Wade Schumacher
- Robert Edward Schwall
- John Campbell Scott
- Paul R. Selvin
- Moshe Shapiro
- Vivek Anand Sharma
- Joseph Shinar
- John Singleton
- Andrei Smolyakov
- Gregory R. Snow
- Stephen Steadman
- Andris Talis Stelbovics
- Kellogg Sheffield Stelle
- Mark David Stiles
- Joseph Paul Straley
- Michael Anthony Stroscio
- Linda Ellen Sugiyama
- Michael James Syphers
- Rongjia Tao
- Craig M. Tarver
- Michael L. Telson
- Louis J. Terminello
- Stephen T. Thornton
- David Tomanek
- Salvatore Torquato
- Michael Matthew John Treacy
- Robert Stephen Tschirhart
- Yuhai Tu
- Donald P. Umstadter
- Veronica Vaida
- Jose Luis Vicent
- Peter Willis Voorhees
- Albert Fordyce Wagner
- David H. Waldeck
- Lawrence B. Weinstein
- Michael Stephen Wertheim
- Frank Wilczek
- Peter Woelfle
- Jonathan Syrkin Wurtele
- Min Xiao
- Victor Mikhailovich Yakovenko
- Perry Yaney
- Victor A. Yarba
- Jun Ye
- Nai-Chang Yeh
- Li-Hua Yu
- Horace P. Yuen
- Gary P. Zank
- Frank Zimmermann
- Stefan Zollner
- Juan J de Pablo
- Ubirajara L. van Kolck

== 2005 ==
- David Albright
- Bruce Allen
- Nils Overgaard Andersen
- Charles E. Anderson
- Scott Law Anderson
- Wanda Andreoni
- Alain Jean Aspect
- Nadine N. Aubry
- Sebastien Balibar
- Supriyo Bandyopadhyay
- Dmitri N. Basov
- Christopher John Bebek
- Eshel Ben-Jacob
- Pallab Bhattacharya
- Carrol Reid Bingham
- Eric G. Blackman
- Gerald Charles Blazey
- Paul Thaddeus Bonoli
- Alexander Mikhailovich Bratkovsky
- William John Briscoe
- Alan David Bross
- Dmitry Budker
- Vasily V. Bulatov
- David G. Cahill
- Bruce E. Carlsten
- Tze-Chiang Chen
- Hai-Ping Cheng
- Yang-Tse Cheng
- Emily Shuk Chi Ching
- Wolfgang Christian
- John M. Cornwall
- Albert Crowe
- Peter T. Cummings
- Steven Thomas Cundiff
- Predrag Cvitanovic
- Eric D'Hoker
- James C Davis
- David P. DeMille
- John Anthony DeSanto
- Michael Paul Desjarlais
- Ivan H. Deutsch
- Todd Ditmire
- William D. Dorland
- David Ross Douglas
- Robert V. Duncan
- John Kelly Eaton
- James N. Eckstein
- Stephen Bernard Fahy
- Joseph Louis Feldman
- Andrew James Fisher
- Peter Karl Fritschel
- James Nathan Fry
- Alexander Luis Gaeta
- K. K. Gan
- Alejandro Garcia
- J. William Gary
- Bruce Douglas Gaulin
- Kurt E. Gibble
- Thomas Glasmacher
- Leonardo Golubovic
- Guang-Yu Guo
- Taekjip Ha
- Aksel L. Hallin
- Jeffrey S. Hangst
- Hartmut Mathes Hofmann
- Klaus Honscheid
- Jean Pierre Hulin
- Gerhard Hummer
- Martin Dominik Hurlimann
- Charles Earl Hyde-Wright
- Lin I
- Carlos A. Iglesias
- Peter Martin Jacobs
- Henri J. F. Jansen
- Tina Marie Kaarsberg
- Mark A. Kasevich
- Emmanuel H. Knill
- Olga Kocharovskaya
- Haruo Kojima
- Kurt Kremer
- Krishna Subramanian Kumar
- Brian L. LaBombard
- Daniel Perry Lathrop
- El-Hang Lee
- Jae Koo Lee
- Mark Lee
- Nancy Ellen Levinger
- Robert J. Levis
- Dongqi Li
- Hui Li
- Xinsheng Sean Ling
- Marjatta A. Lyyra
- Michael C. Mackey
- Jaroslaw Majewski
- Lute Maleki
- Jochen Mannhart
- Michael P. Marder
- Donald Marolf
- Todd J. Martinez
- Martin R Maxey
- Elizabeth F. McCormack
- Kevin S. McFarland
- Arthur Robert McGurn
- Eckart Heinz Meiburg
- Yuri B Melnichenko
- Wallace Kendal Melville
- Aldo Dante Migone
- Laszlo Milhaly
- Michael D Miller
- Udayan Mohanty
- Christopher Roy Monroe
- John Alan Moriarty
- Roman Movshovich
- Elvira Moya De Guerra
- Thomas Mullin
- Khandker Abdul Muttalib
- Satyanarayan Nandi
- Matthias Neubert
- Theodore B. Norris
- Pablo Ordejon
- Lynne Hamilton Orr
- Raymond Osborn
- Krzysztof Pachucki
- Stephen John Pearton
- Timothy John Pedley
- William Anthony Peebles
- Francois M. Peeters
- Unil A. G. Perera
- Cynthia Kieras Phillips
- Jorge Piekarewicz
- William C. Priedhorsky
- Vladimir Privman
- Jianwai Qiu
- Harry Brian Radousky
- Daniel Charles Ralph
- Jayendran Cumaraswamy Rasaiah
- Laura Reina
- R. Riazuddin
- Jorge Juan Rocca
- Warren F. Rogers
- John Ruhl
- James Patrick Runt
- Gregory Charles Rutledge
- William R. Salaneck
- Maria M. Santore
- John Louis Sarrao
- Wayne Mark Saslow
- Levi Schachter
- Thomas M. Schaefer
- Steven J. Schiff
- Tamar Schlick
- Robert J. Schoelkopf
- Joel Nathan Schulman
- Steve Semancik
- Yannis Kyriakos Semertzidis
- Stephen A. Sheffield
- Qun Shen
- Janine Shertzer
- Eric Lawrence Shirley
- Qimiao Si
- Theo Siegrist
- Steven H. Simon
- John (Jack) Peter Simons
- Rajiv R. P. Singh
- Constantine (Gus) Sinnis
- James Gilbert Smith
- Glenn D. Starkman
- James Henry Stathis
- Gennady V. Stupakov
- Igal Szleifer
- Sami G. Tantawi
- Michael Thoennessen
- James Hayden Thomas
- Nancy L. Thompson
- Eite Tiesinga
- Walter Toki
- Jean-Marc Triscone
- Sandra Marina Troian
- Allan J. Tylka
- Cyrus Jehangir Umrigar
- Alexander L. Velikovich
- Michele Viviani
- Vitalii K. Vlasko-Vlasov
- Joannes Theodorus Maria Walraven
- Harry Robert James Walters
- Jian-Sheng Wang
- Zhong Lin Wang
- Hiroshi Watanabe
- Renata Maria M. Wentzcovitch
- Joe Wong
- Sotiris S. Xantheas
- Mohsen S. Yeganeh
- Sherry J. Yennello
- Clare C. Yu
- Lu Yu
- Stephane Zaleski
- Xiao Cheng Zeng
- Shoucheng Zhang
- Shufeng Zhang
- Alexander Zholents
- Fulvio Zonca
- Muhammad Suhail Zubairy

== 2006 ==
- Philip Wayne Adams
- Louis John Allamandola
- Peter Andrew Amendt
- Susan Theresa Arnold
- David Attwood
- Ilya Averbukh
- Sivaramakrishnan Balachandar
- Sanjay Kumar Banerjee
- Stefano Baroni
- Ghassan Batrouni
- Daniel Bauer
- Ulrich J. Becker
- Donald H. Bilderback
- Simon John Laird Billinge
- Estela Olga Blaisten-Barojas
- Edward Charles Blucher
- Girsh Blumberg
- Georg Bollen
- Roger T. Bonnecaze
- Garry L. Brown
- Garnett W. Bryant
- Aurel Bulgac
- Timothy Bunning
- Theodore W. Burkhardt
- Hui Cao
- Hilda A. Cerdeira
- Shirley Suiling Chan
- Choong-Seock Chang
- Manoj K. Chaudhury
- Kwong-sang Cheng
- Siu Ah Chin
- Sung Nee George Chu
- William Arthur Coles
- Gilbert Wilson Collins
- Thomas C. Corke
- Lance Eric De Long
- Michael W. Deem
- Cees Dekker
- Bernard T. Delley
- Alexander A. Demkov
- Brenda Lynn Dingus
- Andrey V. Dobrynin
- Phillip Duxbury
- Glenn S. Edwards
- Daniel S. Elliot
- Steven Charles Erwin
- Brett Daniel Esry
- John R. Ferron
- Peter H. Fisher
- Michael R. Fitzsimmons
- James Knox Freericks
- Guo-yong Fu
- Richard Maurice Fye
- Charles Forbes Gammie
- Francisco Javier Garcia De Abajo
- Ricardo Garcia Garcia
- Peter Motz Gehring
- Gabriele F. Giuliani
- James Alexander Glazier
- Sharon C. Glotzer
- George Thompson Gray
- Roderick George Greaves
- Keith A. Griffioen
- Timothy J. Hallman
- Paula T. Hammond
- George Friedrich Hanne
- Neil Harrison
- Gregory A. Hebner
- Kristian P. Helmerson
- E. Susana Hernandez
- Antonio Hernando
- Hans Jurgen Herrmann
- Kristiaan Ludwig Guido Heyde
- Mark Hillery
- Ian Hinchliffe
- Robert S. Hixson
- Mark J. Hogan
- Philip John Holmes
- Norbert Richard Holtkamp
- Calvin R. Howell
- Qing Hu
- Steven David Hudson
- Gerald P. Huffman
- Ulrich Höfer
- Massimo Inguscio
- Lev B. Ioffe
- Elizabeth Jenkins
- Sabre Kais
- Charles Lewis Kane
- Chi-Chang Kao
- Shashi P. Karna
- Andrew David Kent
- David Alan Kessler
- Dmitri E. Kharzeev
- Yuri S. Kivshar
- Stephen Jacob Klippenstein
- Yury G. Kolomensky
- Martin Harvey Krieger
- Philipp Paul Kronberg
- Chung King Law
- Jonathan Mac Lawrence
- Dietrich Leibfried
- Robert G. Leigh
- Chikang Li
- Jechiel Lichtenstadt
- Zhihong Lin
- Ying Liu
- Zheng-Tian Lu
- Alexander Henderson Lumpkin
- Jacques Magnaudet
- David G. Mandrus
- John Frederick Marko
- Richard Martel
- Jose Luis Martins
- Francoise Masnou-Seeuws
- Howard S. Matis
- Bernard Judah Matkowsky
- Wolodymyr Melnitchouk
- Nikolitsa Merminga
- Gerard J. Milburn
- John Gordon Milton
- William Michael Morse
- Mark G. Mungal
- Norman William Murray
- Sergei Nagaitsev
- Sultana Nurun Nahar
- Michael Anthony Nastasi
- Nathan Newman
- David J. Norris
- David Paul Norton
- Bradford G. Orr
- Peter N. Ostroumov
- William R. Ott
- Ronald L. Panton
- Piero Antonio Pianetta
- Alexander J. Piel
- Michael Plischke
- Dinko Pocanic
- Nikolai V. Prokof'ev
- Dale Ian Pullin
- Frederick J. Raab
- David C. Radford
- Mikhail E. Raikh
- Georg A. Raithel
- Andrew Marshall Rappe
- Frederic A. Rasio
- David H. Reitze
- Raffaele Resta
- Stephen Reucroft
- John Edward Rice
- Steven M. Ritz
- John A. Rogers
- Eli Ira Rosenberg
- Anders Rosengren
- Bradley J. Roth
- Daniel Rugar
- Barry C. Sanders
- Ina Sarcevic
- John Stephen Sarff
- Sutanu Sarkar
- Daniel Wolf Savin
- Lawrence B. Schein
- Jorg Schmalian
- Ulrich Joseph Schollwoeck
- Herwig Schopper
- Steven David Schwartz
- John F. Seely
- Mats Anton Selen
- Balajapalli S. Shastry
- Paul Sheldon
- David W. Snoke
- Dam Thanh Son
- William J. Spalding
- Michael Springborg
- Mohan Srinivasarao
- Jolanta Irene Stankiewicz
- Gustavo A. Stolovitzky
- Hendricus T.C. Stoof
- Martin Stutzmann
- Arthur G. Suits
- Frank Szmulowicz
- Kwong-Tin Tang
- Kenneth Thomas Andrew Taylor
- Eddy M. Timmermans
- Gregory Louis Timp
- John Toner
- Jennie Harriet Traschen
- Rick Peter Trebino
- Manyee Betty Tsang
- Tamas Vicsek
- Gianfranco Vidali
- David M. Villeneuve
- Thomas Vogt
- Arthur F. Voter
- Wladyslaw Walukiewicz
- Enge Wang
- Hailin Wang
- Lin-Wang Wang
- Kerry Lewis Whisnant
- Dennis Gordon Whyte
- Scott Willenbrock
- David Robert Williams
- James Stanislaus Williams
- Michael Grae Worster
- Gang Xiao
- Xueming Yang
- John Martin Yelton
- Pui-Kuen Yeung
- Thad P. Zaleskiewicz
- Yimei Zhu
- Royce K.P. Zia
- Theo J.M. Zouros

== 2007 ==
- Bruce Ackerson
- Herzl Aharoni
- Henri Alloul
- Dan Amidei
- Lynden Archer
- Marina Artuso
- Andrew Bandrauk
- Gang Bao
- Harold Baranger
- Alexis Baratoff
- Amy Barger
- Klaus Bohnen
- Massimo Boninsegni
- Michael Borland
- Elliott R. Brown
- Gail Brown
- John Budai
- Kieron Burke
- David Burrows
- Tucker Carrington
- Peter Celliers
- Massimo Cerdonio
- Britton Chance
- Shih-Lin Chang
- Michael Chapman
- Dante Chialvo
- Leonardo Civale
- Nigel Clarke
- John C. Collins
- Lance R. Collins
- Paul Corkum
- Robin Cote
- Robert Crease
- Vincent Crespi
- Mark Croft
- Michael Crommie
- Michael Cuneo
- Bogdan Dabrowski
- Dipankar Das Sarma
- James DeYoreo
- Roger Dixon
- Aristide Dogariu
- Michel Dupuis
- John Dutcher
- C.W. Francis Everitt
- Gregory Ezra
- Mikhail Feigelman
- Jonathan Feng
- Paul Fenter
- Wolfram Fischer
- Eanna Flanagan
- Michael Flatté
- Geoffrey Forden
- Rodney Fox
- Leonid Frankfurt
- Miguel Furman
- Haiyan Gao
- Peter Garnavich
- S Gary
- Jan Genzer
- Neil Gershenfeld
- Michael Gershenson
- Russell Giannetta
- George Gillies
- Sharath Girimaji
- Peyman Givi
- Mark Glauser
- Ari Glezer
- Robert Golub
- Valeri Goncharov
- Gabriela González
- Xavier Gonze
- A. Gover
- Giorgio Gratta
- Stephen Gray
- Martin Greven
- Rudolf Grimm
- Marilyn Gunner
- Carol K. Hall
- Joseph Haus
- Paula Heron
- Ady Hershcovitch
- Joanne Hewett
- Denise Hinkel
- Morten Hjorth-Jensen
- James Hollenhorst
- Christopher Homes
- Don Howard
- Emlyn Hughes
- Jeffrey Hunt
- Joey Huston
- Yves Idzerda
- Jisoon Ihm
- Kent Irwin
- Charles Jaffe
- Mark Jarrell
- William Jeffrey
- Poul Jessen
- David Jonas
- Kevin Jones
- Igor Kaganovich
- Rajiv Kalia
- Mehran Kardar
- Alain Karma
- Safa Kasap
- Howard Katz
- Edward Kearns
- Steven Kettell
- Shiv Khanna
- Philip Kim
- Yoshifumi Kimura
- Edward Kinney
- David Kirkby
- Paul Kleiber
- Lev Kofman
- Robert Krasny
- Karl Krushelnick
- Sebastian Kuhn
- Christian Kurtsiefer
- Kris Kwiatkowski
- Albert Lazzarini
- Jennifer A. Lewis
- Daniel Lidar
- Yu Lin
- Seth Lloyd
- Lyle Long
- Ellen Longmire
- Jorge Lopez
- Marshall Luban
- Jianpeng Ma
- Augusto Macchiavelli
- Chris Macosko
- Albert Macrander
- Sadamichi Maekawa
- Richard Majeski
- Sara Majetich
- Protik Majumder
- Arjun Makhijani
- F Bary Malik
- Luz Martinez-Miranda
- Thomas E. Mason
- Anne McCoy
- Stephen McKeever
- Gareth McKinley
- Tom McLeish
- Anita Mehta
- Alan Migdall
- Richard Milner
- Rodolfo Miranda
- Noemi Mirkin
- Noor Mohammad
- Victor V. Moshchalkov
- Meenakshi Narain
- Mark Newman
- Thomas Nordlund
- Edward O'Brien
- Jurg Osterwalder
- Clinton Petty
- Richard Phillips
- Eugene Polzik
- Vladimir Prigodin
- Thomas Prince
- Mohit Randeria
- Jean-Marcel Rax
- Lucia Reining
- Edward Rezayi
- Robert Rimmer
- Winston Roberts
- Jan Rost
- Krzysztof Rykaczewski
- Van Saarloos
- Anders Sandvik
- Dipankar Das Sarma
- Hendrik Schatz
- van Schilfgaarde
- Michael Schmidt
- Reinhardt Schuhmann
- Peter Searson
- Edmund Seebauer
- Edward Seidel
- Roseanne Sension
- Donald Shapero
- Michael Shelley
- Chih-Kang Shih
- Pushpendra Singh
- Lee Smolin
- Alexei Sokolov
- Paul Sommers
- Nicola Spaldin
- Harold Spinka
- S Sridhar
- Henrik Stapelfeldt
- Giovanni Stefani
- Thomas Stoehlker
- Matthew Strassler
- Stephen Streiffer
- Svetlana Sukhishvili
- Jonathan Sun
- Attila Szabo
- Raza Tahir-Kheli
- Stavros Tavoularis
- Barbara Terhal
- John Terning
- James Terry
- Naresh Thadhani
- Alan Todd
- DeJan Trbojevic
- Michel Trudeau
- Din Ping Tsai
- John Turneaure
- Sergio Ulloa
- Patrick Vaccaro
- Raju Venugopalan
- Boudewyn Verhaar
- Yurii Vlasov
- Dimitri Vvedensky
- François Waelbroeck
- Lijun Wang
- David Weiss
- Robert Westervelt
- J. Craig Wheeler
- William Wisniewski
- Henryk Witala
- Xiaoxing Xi
- Yoshihisa Yamamoto
- Li You
- Sufi Zafar
- Leonid Zakharov
- Eli Zeldov
- Xiangdong Zhu
- Annette Zippelius
- Max Zolotorev
- Raffaele Mezzenga

== 2008 ==
- Daniel Akerib
- Muhammad Alam
- Robert C. Albers
- Igor Aleiner
- Alexandre Alexandrov
- André Anders
- Spiro Antiochos
- Dimitri Argyriou
- Laszlo Baksay
- Kenneth Baldwin
- Dwight Barkley
- Osman A. Basaran
- Herman Batelaan
- Ulrich Baur
- Gregory Beaucage
- John Belcher
- Fabio Beltram
- Eli Ben-Naim
- Samuel Benz
- Michael Berman
- Luca Biferale
- Klaus Blaum
- Stephan Bless
- Michael R Brown
- Michael Brunger
- Rafael Bruschweiler
- Philip N. Burrows
- Robert Caldwell
- Steven Carlip
- Peggy Cebe
- Bulbul Chakraborty
- Claudio Chamon
- Venkat Chandrasekhar
- Zenghu Chang
- Jian-Ping Chen
- Long-Qing Chen
- Ori Cheshnovsky
- William S. Childress
- Wai-Yim Ching
- Paul K. Chu
- James V. Coe
- John S. Conway
- Alan Costley
- Aldo Covello
- Christine Coverdale
- Paul Crowell
- Jens Dahl
- Pengcheng Dai
- Pawel Danielewicz
- M. Jamal Deen
- Andrei Derevianko
- Thomas Devereaux
- Scott Diddams
- Julian A. Domaradzki
- Jonathan P. Dowling
- Mark D. Doyle
- Ron Elber
- Nader Engheta
- Shanhui Fan
- Ambrogio Fasoli
- Cary Forest
- Gabor Forgacs
- James A. Forrest
- Stephen Forrest
- John Fox
- Eric D Fredrickson
- Chris Fryer
- Chong Long Fu
- David Garfinkle
- Theo Geisel
- Stefan A. Goedeceker
- Bennett Goldberg
- Eugene Golowich
- Maury C. Goodman
- Amit Goyal
- Élisabeth Guazzelli
- Alexander V. Gurevich
- William S. Hammack
- Ulrich H. Hansmann
- Richard Harris
- Anna Hasenfratz
- Dennis Hayes
- Ann Heinson
- Robert Hengehold
- Charles J. Horowitz
- John P. Hughes
- Terence Hwa
- Robert Hwang
- Takashi Imai
- Ravinder K. Jain
- O'Dean Judd
- Kazhikathra Kailasanath
- Vassiliki Kalogera
- Marc P. Kamionkowski
- Peter Kammel
- Daniel Kennefick
- Peter Kes
- Daniel Khomskii
- Peter Kneisel
- Ryosuke Kodama
- Jun Kondo
- Jacobo Konigsberg
- Manoochehr M. Koochesfahani
- Ashutosh Kotwal
- Georg Krausch
- Sergey Kravchenko
- Frank Krennrich
- Ramanan Krishnamoorti
- I. Joseph Kroll
- Alexander Kusenko
- George Kyrala
- Pablo Laguna
- Alessandra Lanzara
- Qi Li
- John Lister
- Thomas W. Ludlam
- Richard M. Lueptow
- Graeme Luke
- Alenka Luzar
- Andy Mackinnon
- Mujeeb R. Malik
- Victor Malka
- Seth R. Marder
- John Markert
- Thomas G. Mason
- Mark W. Matsen
- Konstantin Matveev
- Stephen C. McGuire
- Carmen Menoni
- Curtis Menyuk
- Kathryn Moler
- Klaus Molmer
- Sekazi Mtingwa
- Patric Muggli
- Amy Mullin
- Larry A. Nagahara
- Chang H. Nam
- Paul Nealey
- Dan A. Neumann
- Harvey B. Newman
- Jeffrey S. Nico
- Tae Won Noh
- Yasar Onel
- Paolo Orlandi
- Hans Othmer
- Peter Palffy-Muhoray
- Giulia Pancheri-Srivastava
- Vijay Pande
- Scott E Parker
- John Parsons
- Brooks H. Pate
- Udo Pernisz
- Amanda Petford-Long
- Gerassimos Petratos
- Daniel Phillips
- Simon R. Phillpot
- Piotr Piecuch
- Michael Plesniak
- Marek Ploszajczak
- Eric Poisson
- James V. Porto
- Oleg Prezhdo
- Yongzhong Qian
- Apparao M. Rao
- Triveni Rao
- Sanjay K. Reddy
- Fan Ren
- Norna Robertson
- Eli Rotenberg
- Ira Z. Rothstein
- James Ryan
- Mark Saffman
- Lars Samuelson
- Jacobo Santamaria
- Peter Schmelcher
- Annabella Selloni
- Surajit Sen
- Andrei Seryi
- Allen Sessoms
- Mark Sherwin
- Vladimir D. Shiltsev
- Sung-Chul Shin
- Shalom Shlomo
- Gennady Shvets
- David Siddons
- Rex Skodje
- Leslie M. Smith
- Per Soderlind
- Glenn S. Solomon
- Shivaji Sondhi
- Soren Sorensen
- Richard J. Spontak
- Kyle Squires
- Aephraim M. Steinberg
- Richard Steiner
- Albert Stolow
- Michael Stone
- Bela Sulik
- Boris Svistunov
- Samuel Tabor
- Geoffrey Thornton
- Evgeny Tsymbal
- Joachim Ullrich
- Charles Vane
- Alessandro Vespignani
- Werner Vogelsang
- Sergei Voloshin
- Carlos Wagner
- Simon Watkins
- R. Bruce Weisman
- Chris I. Westbrook
- David Whelan
- Dean Wilkening
- Clayton Williams
- Alec M. Wodtke
- Sunney Xie
- Xincheng Xie
- Victor Yakhot
- Gong Yeh
- Taner Yildirim
- Jan Zaanen
- Joseph A. Zasadzinski
- Oleg Zatsarinny
- Xiang Zhang
- Andrey Zheludev
- Lucy M. Ziurys
- Michael E. Zucker

== 2009 ==
- Cammy R. Abernathy
- Vladimir M. Agranovich
- Doyeol Ahn
- Reka Z. Albert
- James G. Alessi
- Rolf Allenspach
- Farhad Ardalan
- Reza Arghavani
- Roger E.A. Arndt
- Raymond C. Ashoori
- Richard A. Baartman
- Kaladi S. Babu
- Carlo F. Barenghi
- John L. Bechhoefer
- Farhat N. Beg
- David J. Benson
- János Bergou
- Sergey M. Bezrukov
- Rana Biswas
- Zlatko Blacic
- Charles T. Black
- Roger Blandford
- John M. Blondin
- Tomas Bohr
- Eric Borguet
- David K. Bradley
- William N. Brandt
- James G. Brasseur
- Sergey Budko
- John W.M. Bush
- Franco Cacialli
- Laurence S. Cain
- Manuela Campanelli
- Jeff Candy
- Gang Cao
- John Carlstrom
- G. Lawrence Carr
- Steven L. Ceccio
- Ruth W. Chabay
- Mark B. Chadwick
- Ching-Ray Chang
- Keejoo Chang
- Jeffrey R. Childress
- Matthew F. Chisholm
- Andrew N. Cleland
- Lynn Cominsky
- Donald G. Crabb
- Jeffrey D. Crouch
- Karsten V. Danzmann
- Hans W. Diehl
- Milind Diwan
- Robert R. Doering
- Luming Duan
- James W. Dufty
- Jens G. Eggers
- Sarah C. Eno
- Klaus Ensslin
- Todd Evans
- Bradley Filippone
- Katherine Freese
- Laurence E. Fried
- Mamoru Fujiwara
- Bo Gao
- Andrea M.V. Garofalo
- Yuval Gefen
- Thomas R. Gentile
- Joseph A. Giaime
- Xingao Gong
- Stephen Gourlay
- David J. Griffiths
- Carl J. Gross
- Supratik Guha
- Jens H. Gundlach
- Gernot Guntherodt
- Gaston R. Gutierrez
- Maciej S. Gutowski
- Richard F. Haglund
- Gregory E. Hall
- Scott T. Hannahs
- Siegfried S. Hecker
- Alexander Heger
- Beate Heinemann
- Ulrich Heintz
- Kerry W. Hipps
- Theodore W. Hodapp
- Craig J. Hogan
- Umran Inan
- Kevin Ingersent
- Van Isacker
- Christopher Jarzynski
- Raymond Jeanloz
- Kevin L. Jensen
- Quanxi Jia
- Samuel J. Jiang
- Albrecht Karle
- Ram S. Katiyar
- Joseph Katz
- Robert M. Kerr
- J.O. Kessler
- Bamin Khomami
- Jin K. Kim
- Spencer Klein
- Junichiro Kono
- Kannan M. Krishnan
- Alexander M. Kuzmich
- Jueinai Kwo
- Greg Landsberg
- Robert E. Laxdal
- Ka Yee C. Lee
- Stanislas Leibler
- Jeremy Levy
- Eric K. Lin
- James T. Linnemann
- Paolo Luchini
- Michael Luke
- Chung-Pei M. Ma
- Rajesh Maingi
- Charles M. Marcus
- David C. Martin
- Dmitri Maslov
- Patricia L. McBride
- Gail C. McLaughlin
- Robert D. McMichael
- Mark W. Meisel
- Ulf G. Meissner
- Narayanan Menon
- Gerhard Meyer
- Peter F. Michelson
- Dennis M. Mills
- Rory A. Miskimen
- Laurens W. Molenkamp
- Arthur Molvik
- Teresa Montaruli
- David C. Morse
- Juan G. Muga
- Michael S. Murillo
- Ganpathy N. Murthy
- Balakrishnan Naduvalath
- Aiichiro Nakano
- Rajamani Narayanan
- Thomas Nattermann
- Raffi M. Nazikian
- Kenji Ohmori
- Roberto Onofrio
- Carlos R. Ordonez
- Christine A. Orme
- Pal Ormos
- Shelley A. Page
- Ci-Ling Pan
- Yung Woo Park
- David S. Perry
- Joseph W. Perry
- Rob Phillips
- Kok-Khoo Phua
- Robert K. Plunkett
- David F. Plusquellic
- Jianming Qian
- Stephen R. Quake
- Eliot J. Quataert
- Yuri Ralchenko
- John C. Raymond
- Bruce C. Reed
- Francoise Remacle
- John Keith Riles
- Mo Samimy
- Brian L. Sawford
- Gregory K. Schenter
- Alan Jay Schwartz
- Nathan Seiberg
- Xiaowen Shan
- Dan Shapira
- Sergey Sheyko
- Luis O. Silva
- Gary W. Slater
- Andrei N. Slavin
- Kevin E. Smith
- Lee G. Sobotka
- Yiqiao Song
- Fotis Sotiropoulos
- Carl R. Sovinec
- James S. Speck
- Donald W.L. Sprung
- John W. Staples
- Mark J. Stevens
- Gay B. Stewart
- Rhonda M. Stroud
- Peter W. Talkner
- Tomasz R. Taylor
- Pappannan Thiyagarajan
- E. Terry Tomboulis
- Steven P. Trainoff
- Jüergen Troe
- Vladimir V. Tsuknuk
- Thomas Ullrich
- Joka M. Vandenberg
- Usha Varshney
- Matt Visser
- Konstantin L. Vodopyanov
- Juwen Wang
- Michelle D. Wang
- Timothy Wei
- Hanno H. Weitering
- Catherine L. Westfall
- Nicholas E. White
- George M. Whitesides
- Scott Wilks
- Brian L. Winer
- Bogdan B. Wojtsekhowski
- Richard Wolfson
- Darien R. Wood
- Yue Wu
- Nu Xu
- Dmitri Yakovlev
- Ali Yazdani
- Anvar Zakhidov
- Jorg Zegenhagen
- Jin Z. Zhang
- Shiwei Zhang
- Dongping Zhong
- Wojciech H. Zurek

== 2010 ==
- Harald Ade
- Musahid Ahmed
- Charles Ahn
- Triantaphyllos Akylas
- Muhammad Arif
- Mark Asta
- Stefano Atzeni
- Van Baak
- Olgica Bakajin
- Ian Balitsky
- Anthony Baltz
- Gerrit E. Bauer
- Paulo Bedaque
- Dietrich Belitz
- Laurent Bellaiche
- David Bennett
- Flemming Besenbacher
- Pushpalatha Bhat
- Michael Blaskiewicz
- Doerte Blume
- Patrick Brady
- Kenneth Breuer
- Mark Brongersma
- J. David Brown
- David Bruhwiler
- Carl Brune
- Marco Buongiorno-Nardelli
- Sean Carroll
- Cynthia Cattell
- Taihyun Chang
- Kookheon Char
- Jeremy Chittenden
- Haecheon Choi
- David Christen
- Isaac Chuang
- Brian Cole
- Timothy Colonius
- Genevieve Comte-Bellot
- Scott Crooker
- Vikram Dalal
- Liem Dang
- Arati Dasgupta
- William Daughton
- Michael Day
- Dmitri Denisov (scientist)
- Ali Dhinojwala
- Gerald Diebold
- Keith Dienes
- Hong Ding
- Weixing Ding
- Vladimir Dobrosavljevic
- Valeriy Dolmatov
- Vinayak Dravid
- Tevian Dray
- Jan Egedal
- Jon Eggert
- Latifa Elouadrhiri
- Jonathan Engel
- Lloyd Engel
- Henry Everitt
- Li-Zhi Fang
- Kristen Fichthorn
- Victor Flambaum
- James Franson
- Michael Fuhrer
- James Fuller
- Tom Furtak
- Wei Gai
- Richard Gaitskell
- David Geohegan
- Cecilia Gerber
- Pupa Gilbert
- Steven Greenbaum
- Niels Gronbech-Jensen
- Francois Gygi
- Stanley Haan
- Carl Hagen
- Hans Hammer
- Sharon Hammes-Schiffer
- James Hannon
- H. Hentschel
- Burkard Hillebrands
- Richard Hughes
- Plamen Ch. Ivanov
- Bahram Jalali
- Michel Janssen
- Julius Jellinek
- Bogumil Jeziorski
- Hongxing Jiang
- Rongying Jin
- Hiroshi Jinnai
- David Kaiser
- John Kasianowicz
- Maki Kawai
- T. A. Kennedy
- Stephen Kent
- Thomas Kephart
- Ching-Hwa Kiang
- David Kieda
- Alejandro Kievsky
- Thomas Killian
- DaiSik Kim
- Greg Kimmel
- William Klein
- Leonhard Kleiser
- Randall Knize
- Arshad Kudrolli
- Vasudevan Lakshminarayanan
- Seung Lee
- Luis Lehner
- Amy Liu
- Wolfgang Lorenzon
- Mikhail Lukin
- Li-Shi Luo
- En Ma
- Ivan Marusic
- Bruce Mason
- John Mateja
- Nergis Mavalvala
- David McClelland
- David McComas
- Robert McQueeney
- Jonathan Menard
- Jose Mestre (physicist)
- Marc Meyers
- A. Alan Middleton
- Katsumi Midorikawa
- Lubos Mitas
- Joseph Mohr
- David Morrissey
- Igor Moskalenko
- Christopher Mudry
- Priyamvada Natarajan
- Keith Nugent
- Yuko Okamoto
- Peter Olmsted
- Samuel Paolucci
- Hye-Sook Park
- Peter Pesic
- Zoran Petrović
- Hong Qiang
- Zi Q. Qiu
- Yevgeny Raitses
- Devulapalli Rao
- Jeffrey Reimer
- Mary Hall Reno
- Peter Rez
- Michael Rijssnbeek
- Barrett Rogers
- Richard Rowberg
- Andrei Ruckenstein
- Petra Rudolf
- Steven Sabbagh
- Scott Sandford
- Juan Santiago
- Misak Sargsian
- Stephen Schnetzer
- Lutz Schweikhard
- Jacek Sekutowicz
- Sudip Sen
- Eun-Suk Seo
- Paul Shapiro
- Krishna Shenai
- Charles Sherrill
- Anchang Shi
- Thomas Silva
- Sindee Simon
- Peter Simpkins
- Rajiv Singh
- Jairo Sinova
- Sivalingam Sivananthan
- Ralph Skomski
- Philip Snyder
- Ratnasingham Sooryakumar
- Davison Soper
- Steven Spangler
- Geoffrey Spedding
- George Srajer
- Albert Stebbins
- Kathleen Stebe
- Mark Stockman
- Giancarlo Strinati
- Gregory Sullivan
- Benjamin Svetitsky
- Eric Scott Swanson
- Craig Taatjes
- Hidenori Takagi
- Ichiro Takeuchi
- Jau Tang
- Lei-Han Tang
- NJ Tao
- Penger Tong
- William Trischuk
- Matthias Troyer
- George Tynan
- Neil deGrasse Tyson
- Thomas Udem
- Richard Vaia
- Steven J. van Enk
- Carolyne Van Vliet
- John Vassilicos
- Peter Vekilov
- Emmanuel Villermaux
- Ramona Vogt
- Igor Vurgaftman
- Mickey Wade
- Fuqiang Wang
- Jin Wang
- Jin Wang
- Xun-Li Wang
- William Weber
- Matthias Weidemuller
- Andrew White
- Gary White
- Martin White
- Denis Wirtz
- Frank Wise
- Christopher Wolverton
- Lawrence Woolf
- Yong-Shi Wu
- Keqing Xia
- Jingming Xu
- Zhangbu Xu
- Yasunori Yamazaki
- Rikutaro Yoshida
- Farhad Yusef-Zadeh
- Cosmas Zachos
- Khairul B. M. Zaman
- Martin Zanni
- John Zasadzinski
- Huan-Xiang Zhou
- George O. Zimmerman
- Andrew Zwicker

== See also ==
- List of American Physical Society Fellows (1921–1971)
- List of American Physical Society Fellows (1972–1997)
- List of American Physical Society Fellows (2011–)
