= Bamin Khomami =

Bamin Khomami, the Granger and Beaman Distinguished University Professor from the University of Tennessee and former Francis F. Ahmann Professor of Chemical Engineering at University of Illinois, was awarded the status of Fellow in the American Physical Society, after they were nominated by their Division of Fluid Dynamics in 2009, for his insightful application of novel numerical methods, molecular modeling, and experiments toward the physical understanding of elastic fluid flows including discovering and explaining novel aspects of their purely elastic and thermomechanical instability.

== See also ==
- List of fellows of the American Physical Society (1998–2010)
