= Pierre Baruch =

French physicist

Pierre Baruch (1927–2017) was a French solid-state physicist. He attended the Ecole Normale Supérieure, and later was on the faculty of Universite Paris 7 - Denis Diderot,

He was awarded the status of Fellow of the American Physical Society after he was nominated by their Forum on International Physics in 2001 for his theoretical studies on energy conversion and the thermodynamic description of photovoltaic cell operation, as well as for his numerous actions in support of international scientific cooperation, e.g., through the Organisation for Economic Co-operation and Development and its Megascience Forum.

== See also ==
- List of fellows of the American Physical Society (1998–2010)
