= James DeYoreo =

James DeYoreo is the Battelle Fellow and Initiative Lead for the Materials Synthesis and Simulation Across Scales Initiative at the Pacific Northwest National Laboratory in Richland, Washington. Concurrent with his position at PNNL, he is a member of the graduate faculty, materials science and engineering, University of Washington.

== Biography ==
DeYoreo received his PhD from Cornell University in 1985. Following postdoctoral work at Princeton University, he joined Lawrence Livermore National Laboratory in 1989, where he held numerous positions, including group leader for biophysical and interfacial sciences, director of the biosecurity and nanosciences laboratory, and deputy director of the laboratory science and technology office. He joined Lawrence Berkeley National Laboratory in 2007, where he served as deputy director and interim director of the molecular foundry. He was awarded the status of Fellow in the American Physical Society in 2007, for his pioneering work using in situ force microscopy to understand the physical principles underlying biocrystallization, particularly the control of biomolecules and other modifiers on energy landscapes, step dynamics and morphological evolution during crystal formation.

== Honors and recognition ==
DeYoreo is a member of the American Physical Society, American Chemical Society, the American Association for Crystal Growth, and was selected as a fellow of the American Physical Society, fellow of the Materials Research Society. He is a recipient of the Laudise Prize of the International Organization for Crystal Growth, the (AACG) Crystal Growth Award, an R&D 100 Award, and the Lawrence Livermore National Laboratory Science and Technology Award. DeYoreo was elected as a member of the National Academy of Engineering in 2022.

== See also ==
- List of fellows of the American Physical Society (1998–2010)
