= Ravinder K. Jain =

Ravinder Kumar Jain is an American engineer, physicist, and academic from the University of New Mexico. He was awarded the status of Fellow in the American Physical Society, after they were nominated by their Forum on Industrial and Applied Physics in 2008, for pioneering contributions in several areas of applied physics, including discovery of plasmon-mediated light-emission from tunnel junctions, seminal studies of nonlinear optics in semiconductors and optical fibers, and the invention of several important ultrashort pulse lasers and fiber lasers.

He received a PhD from University of California, Berkeley in 1974.

== See also ==
- List of fellows of the American Physical Society (1998–2010)
