= Arunava Gupta =

Arunava Gupta from the IBM T.J. Watson Research Center, was awarded the status of Fellow in the American Physical Society, after he was nominated by the Division of Materials Physics in 1998, for contributions to the development of pulsed laser deposition techniques, the use of this technique for the production of materials with novel physical properties, and for original contributions to the understanding of nonequilibrium film-growth mechanisms.

== See also ==
- List of fellows of the American Physical Society (1998–2010)
