= Michael Hass =

Physicist

Michael Hass (Hebrew: מייקל האס) of the Weizmann Institute of Science was awarded the status of Fellow in the American Physical Society, after he was nominated by his Division of Nuclear Physics in 1999 for "innovative experiments on parity violation in nuclear electromagnetic decay and on measurements of electromagnetic moments of short lived nuclear states via the development of transient hyperfine magnetic field and tilted foil techniques essential to align and polarize nuclei."

== See also ==
- List of fellows of the American Physical Society (1998–2010)
