= Donald Ray Wiff =

Donald Ray Wiff from the Kent State University, was awarded the status of Fellow in the American Physical Society, after they were nominated by their Forum on Industrial and Applied Physics in 1999, for research in solving mathematically ill-posed problems in polymer molecular weight and mechanical relaxation time distribution functions, and in developing molecular, in situ molecular and nanocomposite polymer concepts for high performance materials and micoelectromechanical system devices.

== See also ==
- List of fellows of the American Physical Society (1998–2010)
