= Arthur Eugene Livingston =

Physicist

Arthur Eugene Livingston from the University of Notre Dame, was awarded the status of Fellow in the American Physical Society, after they were nominated by their Division of Atomic, Molecular & Optical Physics in 1998, for his contributions to the understanding of relativistic, QED, and Rydberg state atomic structures through the spectroscopy of highly-charged ions, and for precise determinations of excited-state lifetimes involving allowed and forbidden atomic transitions.

== See also ==
- List of fellows of the American Physical Society (1998–2010)
