= Mark Douglas Havey =

Mark Douglas Havey from Old Dominion University, was awarded the status of Fellow in the American Physical Society, after he was nominated by his Division of Atomic, Molecular & Optical Physics in 1998, for development and explication of novel one- and two-photon spectroscopies of bound and dissociative electronic states of diatomic molecules; also for development of precision atomic two-photon polarization spectroscopy for determination of atomic matrix elements and novel sum rule.

== See also ==
- List of fellows of the American Physical Society (1998–2010)
