= Chong Long Fu =

American physicist

Chong Long Fu from the Oak Ridge National Laboratory, was awarded the status of Fellow in the American Physical Society, after they were nominated by their Division of Materials Physics in 2008, for outstanding contributions to the fundamental understanding of the electronic, magnetic, and structural properties of metallic and intermetallic systems based on accurate first-principles calculations and to the development of novel high temperature intermetallics and nanocluster strengthened alloys for structural applications.

== See also ==
- List of fellows of the American Physical Society (1998–2010)
