= Franco Cacialli =

Italian physicist

Franco Cacialli is an Italian physicist affiliated with the University College London. He was awarded the status of Fellow in the American Physical Society, after he was nominated by the Division of Materials Physics in 2009, for "his significant contributions to the science and technology of organic semiconductors and related applications, and especially for seminal contributions to the scanning near-field optical microscopy (SNOM) assisted lithography of organic semiconductor nanostructures.

Cacialli is a co-director of the London Institute for Advanced Light Technologies

== See also ==
- List of fellows of the American Physical Society (1998–2010)
