= Sergio Ulloa =

- Education: Ph.D., State University New York, Buffalo (1984) B.Sc. Physics, National University of Mexico - UNAM (1979)
- Scientific career
- Workplaces: Ohio University

Sergio Ulloa from the Ohio University, was awarded the status of Fellow in the American Physical Society, after they were nominated by their Forum on International Physics in 2007, for "his contributions to the theory of transport and optical properties of low-dimensional semiconductor systems and complex molecules, and his many contributions to international physics as organizer of schools, workshops, and conferences, in particular in Latin America."

== See also ==
- List of fellows of the American Physical Society (1998–2010)
