= Mukunda Prasad Das =

Mukunda Prasad Das (born 4 January 1945) is an Indian-born Australian physicist at the Australian National University.

He was elected a Fellow of the American Physical Society after he was nominated by their Forum on International Physics in 2003, for notable theoretical investigations in condensed matter physics, namely: mesoscopic transport and noise, high temperature superconductivity and density functional theory; and for significant leadership in promoting international meetings and collaborations.

== See also ==
- List of fellows of the American Physical Society (1998–2010)
