= Donald G. Crabb =

Donald G. Crabb from the University of Virginia, was awarded the status of Fellow in the American Physical Society, after he was nominated by the Division of Nuclear Physics in 2009, for "his contributions to the use of high field polarized targets and development of high polarization and radiation resistant polarized target materials and his role in using them in seminal particle physics experiments and advancing the knowledge of the behavior in high intensity beams".

== See also ==
- List of fellows of the American Physical Society (1998–2010)
