= Uri Feldman =

Fellow of the American Physical Society

Uri Feldman (17 April 1935 – 26 February 2023) from the Naval Research Laboratory, was awarded the status of Fellow in the American Physical Society, after they were nominated by their Division of Plasma Physics in 2000, for original contributions to the study of the atomic structure of highly excited elements, both the development of advanced tools to conduct observations and the analysis and interpretation of the resulting data; and for the application of the physics of highly excited elements to the study of energetic processes in the sun's atmosphere.

== See also ==
- List of fellows of the American Physical Society (1998–2010)
