= Rodolfo Miranda =

Spanish physicist

Rodolfo Miranda is a Spanish physicist working at the University Autonoma de Madrid. He was awarded the status of Fellow by the American Physical Society, after being nominated by the university's Division of Materials Physics in 2007, for his contributions to surface and thin film magnetism, including new methods of epitaxial growth using surfactants or controlling the morphology at the atomic scale, the identification and characterization of model systems for magnetism in low dimensions, and the observation of magic heights in metallic islands.

== See also ==
- List of fellows of the American Physical Society (1998–2010)
