= Gaston R. Gutierrez =

Gaston R. Gutierrez currently works at Fermi National Accelerator Laboratory (Fermilab) where he holds a Scientist II position. He completed his undergraduate education in the National University of La Plata, Argentina in 1977. In 1982 he received his PhD from the same institution. He was awarded the status of Fellow in the American Physical Society, after he was nominated by the Division of Particles and Fields in 2009, for leading the introduction of "matrix-element" techniques for extracting precise measurements of standard-model parameters at hadron colliders and for seminal and vital contributions to the construction of the unique scintillating fiber tracker for the DZero experiment.

== See also ==
- List of fellows of the American Physical Society (1998–2010)
