= Stephen P. Reynolds =

Stephen P. Reynolds from North Carolina State University, was awarded the status of Fellow in the American Physical Society, after he was nominated by his Division of Astrophysics in 2000, for contributions to high-energy astrophysics, including modeling relativistic jets in quasars, pulsar-driven supernova remnants, and electron acceleration to synchrotron X-ray emitting energies in young shell supernova remnants, and supporting observations.

== See also ==
- List of fellows of the American Physical Society (1998–2010)
