= Jianpeng Ma =

Jianpeng Ma from the Baylor College of Medicine, was awarded the status of Fellow in the American Physical Society, after they were nominated by their Division of Biological Physics in 2007, for contributions to the field of biophysics in developing computational methods to simulate, model and refine flexible biomolecular systems based on experimental data at low to intermediate resolutions.

== See also ==
- List of fellows of the American Physical Society (1998–2010)
