= Jerome Lewis Duggan =

American physicist

Jerome Lewis Duggan (August 4, 1933 – August 31, 2014) was a Regents Professor at the University of North Texas (UNT), the founder of the International Conference on the Application of Accelerators in Research and Industry (CAARI). He was also a Fellow in the American Physical Society.

Dr. Duggan was an assistant professor at the University of Georgia from 1961–1963. He worked for ten years at Oak Ridge Associated Universities before starting at UNT in 1973 as a professor in the Physics Department. He was awarded the UNT President's Award and was awarded the status of Fellow in the American Physical Society, after they were nominated by their Forum on Industrial and Applied Physics in 2000.

== See also ==
- List of fellows of the American Physical Society (1998–2010)
