= Roderick V. Jensen =

Roderick V. Jensen from the Wesleyan University, was awarded the status of Fellow in the American Physical Society, after they were nominated by their Division of Materials Physics in 2000, for pioneering contributions to the understanding of strongly perturbed quantum systems that are classically chaotic, like Rydberg atoms in strong fields, and for the extension of the methods of nonlinear dynamics across many disciplines, from atomic physics and mesoscopic solid-state physics to biophysics and neuroscience.

== See also ==
- List of fellows of the American Physical Society (1998–2010)
