= Patrick L. McGaughey =

American nuclear physicist

Patrick L. McGaughey from the Los Alamos National Laboratory, was awarded the status of Fellow in the American Physical Society, after they were nominated by their Division of Nuclear Physics in 1998, for his contributions to experimental high-energy nuclear physics; including his leadership of Fermilab E866, his penetrating contributions to the understanding of J/y production in nuclear collisions, and his insight and leadership in helping formulate the conceptual design of the PHENIX detector at RHIC.

== See also ==
- List of fellows of the American Physical Society (1998–2010)
