= Michael J. Leitch =

Michael J. Leitch from the Los Alamos National Laboratory, was awarded the status of Fellow in the American Physical Society, after they were nominated by their Division of Nuclear Physics in 2000, for his contributions to experimental medium-energy and high-energy nuclear physics, in particular for his lead role in measurements of pion double-charge exchange at low energies, and his leadership in the measurement of nuclear dependencies of J/psi production and of open charm production.

== See also ==
- List of fellows of the American Physical Society (1998–2010)
