= Shang-Fen Ren =

Physicist

- Born: 07/27/1946
- Scientific career
- Fields: semiconductor systems silicon wafer production

Shang-Fen Ren is a professor emerita at Illinois State University.

She was appointed professor at Illinois in 1995, retiring to become professor emerita in 2011.

She was awarded the status of Fellow in the American Physical Society, after she was nominated by their Forum on International Physics in 2001, "for her contributions to theoretical understanding of low-dimensional semiconductor systems, especially the vibrational properties in semiconductor superlattices, quantum wires, and quantum dots as well as for her many contributions promoting international physics."

She, Yaomin Xia, and Renxin Xia filled a patent on May 13, 2012, published on Nov 29, 2012, for "Vacuum plasma processing chamber with a wafer chuck facing downward above the plasma". This invention pertains to the manufacturing process of silicon wafers, and its focus is on minimizing the defects caused be contamination via holding the wafer from above, so that gravity will not pull dust or other obstructions onto the wafer's surface.

== See also ==
- List of fellows of the American Physical Society (1998–2010)
