= Carl R. Sovinec =

Carl Richard Sovinec is an American physicist from the University of Wisconsin, Madison.

Sovinec is the son of Dr. Richard and Cathleen Sovinec and a 1981 graduate of Winona Senior High School in Winona, Minnesota. He attended the United States Air Force Academy in Colorado Springs, Colorado. He was awarded the status of Fellow in the American Physical Society, after they were nominated by their Division of Plasma Physics in 2009, for using large scale magnetohydrodynamic simulation to elucidate the roles of reconnection, relaxation and transport in self-organization processes of low field magnetic confinement devices and for providing a primary scientific leadership role in the development of the NIMROD project.

== See also ==
- List of fellows of the American Physical Society (1998–2010)
