= John W. Staples =

John W. Staples from the Lawrence Berkeley National Laboratory, was awarded the status of Fellow in the American Physical Society, after he was nominated by the Division of Physics of Beams in 2009, for his exemplary leadership and contributions to the design, fabrication and commissioning of radio frequency quadrupoles, for his innovative work in the development of femtosecond beam synchronization techniques, and for dedication to the mentoring of accelerator students and young colleagues.

He received his First Class Radiotelephone (with Radar) and Extra Class ham (amateur radio) licenses in 1958. Besides being an avid collector of vintage electronics, he has been a passionate motorcyclist for over 50 years. Dr. Staples is a principal of the California Historical Radio Society (CHRS, Alameda, California), and a Fellow in Preservation (2011); and as a lead author, shared in the Antique Wireless Association (N.Y.) Taylor Award for 2020 for the CHRS Special Edition “Television” (2019) edited by Richard Watts. “The Taylor Award was presented to the California Historical Radio Society *** The Taylor Award … is given in memory of John P. Taylor, TV developer at RCA and editor of the RCA Broadcast News, for documentation or preservation of the history of television technology.” The several articles by Dr. Staples in "Television" resulted in an outstanding review.

== See also ==
- List of fellows of the American Physical Society (1998–2010)
