= János Bergou =

Hungarian physicist

János Bergou (born 22 March 1947) is a Hungarian physicist and academic who is currently a professor at Hunter College in New York. In 2009, he was awarded the status of Fellow in the American Physical Society, after they were nominated by their Division of Laser Science in 2009, for "outstanding work in quantum optics and quantum information, in particular work on the theory of correlated emission lasers, the effect of pump statistics on the nature of the electromagnetic field produced in lasers and micromasers, and on quantum state discrimination."

Bergou earned a master's in science (1970) and earned his PhD summa cum laude in Theoretical Physics (1975) from Eötvös Loránd University in Budapest. From the Hungarian Academy of Sciences, he received his Habilitation (CSc) (1982) and Doctor of Sciences (DSc) (1994).

== See also ==
- List of fellows of the American Physical Society (1998–2010)
