= Ruqian Wu =

Professor of physics and astronomy

Ruqian Wu is a professor of physics and astronomy at the University of California, Irvine (UCI). His primary research area is condensed matter physics.

He gained a Ph.D. at the Institute of Physics, Academia Sinica

He was awarded the status of Fellow in the American Physical Society, after he was nominated by their Division of Computational Physics in 2001, for contributions to the understanding of magnetic, electronic, mechanical, chemical and optical properties of compounds, alloys, interfaces, thin films and surfaces using first-principles calculations and for development of the methods and codes for such components.

== See also ==
- List of fellows of the American Physical Society (1998–2010)
