= Gregory Lawrence Eyink =

American mathematical physicist

Gregory Lawrence Eyink is an American mathematical physicist at Johns Hopkins University.

He received his bachelor's degree in mathematics and philosophy (1981) and Doctor of Philosophy (1987) from Ohio State University. He now holds joint appointments in the departments of Physics and Astronomy, Mathematics, and Mechanical Engineering at Johns Hopkins.

He was awarded the status of Fellow of the American Physical Society, after being nominated by their Topical Group on Statistical and Nonlinear Physics in 2003, for his work in nonequilibrium statistical mechanics, in particular on the foundation of transport laws in chaotic dynamical systems, on field-theoretic methods in statistical hydrodynamics and on singularities and dissipative anomalies in fluid turbulence.

== See also ==
- List of fellows of the American Physical Society (1998–2010)
