= Aiichiro Nakano =

Aiichiro Nakano from the University of Southern California, was awarded the status of Fellow in the American Physical Society, after they were nominated by their Division of Computational Physics in 2009, for the development and implementation of scalable parallel and distributed algorithms for large-scale atomistic simulations to predict, visualize, and analyze reaction processes for novel nano-mechano-chemical phenomena encompassing diverse spatiotemporal scales.

== See also ==
- List of fellows of the American Physical Society (1998–2010)
