= Christian Mailhiot =

Physicist

Christian Mailhiot is an American physicist from the Lawrence Livermore National Laboratory. He was awarded the status of Fellow in the American Physical Society, after being nominated by their Division of Materials Physics in 2003 for his outstanding contributions and scientific leadership in theoretical and computational condensed matter and materials physics, with particular emphasis on innovative discoveries related to quantum-confined semiconductor structures and high-pressure research.

== See also ==
- List of fellows of the American Physical Society (1998–2010)
