= Vladimir Prigodin =

Vladimir Nikolayevich Prigodin (Russian: Влади́мир Никола́евич Приго́дин; born 1951) is a Russian physicist and academic from Ohio State University. He was previously at Ioffe Institute in Saint Petersburg, Russia. He was awarded the status of Fellow in the American Physical Society, after they were nominated by their Division of Condensed Matter Physics in 2007, for his pioneering studies of electronic properties of low-dimensional systems, proposal and development of fundamentals of charge transport in quasi-one-dimensional disordered structures, and also of operating principals of new organic-based electronic materials/devices and fully spin polarized organic spintronic materials/devices.

== See also ==
- List of fellows of the American Physical Society (1998–2010)
