= Udo Pernisz =

Udo Pernisz from the Dow Corning Corporation, was awarded the status of Fellow in the American Physical Society, after he was nominated by his Forum on Industrial and Applied Physics in 2008, for his contributions to making siloxane resins a commercial success as spin-on dielectrics in the IC industry, and his investigations of the luminescence of Si-containing organic and inorganic compounds that led to the development of novel materials for photonics applications.

== See also ==
- List of fellows of the American Physical Society (1998–2010)
