= Noemi Mirkin =

Argentine-born American physicist

- Born: Buenos Aires, Argentina
- Citizenship: United States
- Education: National University of Tucuman
- Known for: Vibrational Spectroscopy, Protein structure
- Scientific career
- Workplaces: University of Michigan
- Website: https://lsa.umich.edu/biophysics/people/research-scientists-and-lecturers/nmirkin.html

Noemi Mirkin from the University of Michigan, was awarded the status of Fellow in the American Physical Society, after they were nominated by their Forum on International Physics in 2007, for "her leadership in establishing productive international collaborations, her many achievements in biological molecular physics and for her long service to the international community as an officer and Executive Committee member of the Forum on International Physics."

== See also ==
- List of fellows of the American Physical Society (1998–2010)
