= László Baksay =

Hungarian physicist and academic (1945–2020)

László András Baksay (22 July 1945 – 13 January 2020) was a Hungarian physicist and academic. He was a former professor and head of the Physics and Space Sciences at the Department of Physics and Space Sciences at the Florida Institute of Technology.

Baksay was born in Budapest in 1945, but his family moved to Germany in 1956, where he went to high school in Düsseldorf. He received his doctorate from RWTH Aachen University, in Aachen, West Germany, in 1978.

He was awarded the status of Fellow in the American Physical Society, after they were nominated by their Forum on International Physics in 2008, for "his contributions to high energy physics, leadership of international collaborations especially in bringing the Hungarian physics community into the international enterprise, innovations and activities in science education and many efforts for the APS international program and the Forum on International Physics."

== See also ==
- List of fellows of the American Physical Society (1998–2010)
