= Karl Krushelnick =

American physicist

Karl Krushelnick is an American plasma physicist located at the University of Michigan. He was awarded the status of Fellow in the American Physical Society, after he was nominated by the university's Division of Plasma Physics in 2007, for "pioneering contributions to experimental high-intensity laser plasma physics including the production of high-quality relativistic electron beams, energetic proton beams and the development of techniques to measure very large magnetic fields in intense laser-produced plasmas."

== See also ==
- List of fellows of the American Physical Society (1998–2010)
