= James G. Brasseur =

American researcher

James G. Brasseur is a professor from the Pennsylvania State University, who was awarded the status of Fellow in the American Physical Society, after he was nominated by the Division of Fluid Dynamics in 2009, for advancements in knowledge of nonclassical interscale interactions in turbulence and in large-eddy simulation of the high Reynolds number boundary layer, and for interdisciplinary contributions to gastro-intestinal medicine by integrating physiology, mechanics, and mathematical modeling.

== See also ==
- List of fellows of the American Physical Society (1998–2010)
