= Alessandro G. Ruggiero =

Alessandro G. Ruggiero from the Brookhaven National Laboratory, was awarded the status of Fellow in the American Physical Society, after he was nominated by the Division of Physics of Beams in 1998, for contributions to accelerator theory, including instabilities and nonlinear dynamics; to accelerator complex designs notably the Antiproton Source and the Relativistic Heavy Ion Collider; and to accelerator architecture investigation of Spallation Neutron Sources.

== See also ==
- List of fellows of the American Physical Society (1998–2010)
