= Daniel Phillips (physicist) =

American physicist

Daniel Phillips from Ohio University, was awarded the status of Fellow in the American Physical Society, after they were nominated by their Topical Group on Few-Body Systems in 2008, for "his research on effective hadronic theories of few-nucleon systems, especially on the role of the Delta (1232) and the description of electromagnetic reactions on light nuclei, and their application in obtaining reliable information on neutron properties from experimental data."

== See also ==
- List of fellows of the American Physical Society (1998–2010)
