= Brenton Raymond Lewis =

Brenton Raymond Lewis was an Australian physicist, Emeritus Professor at Australian National University from 1979 to 2012.

He qualified PhD and DSc at Adelaide University and was a fellow of the Institute of Physics and the American Physical Society.

He was awarded the status of Fellow in the American Physical Society, after he was nominated by their Forum on International Physics in 2001, for "his seminal studies of the electronic structure of atmospheric molecules, particularly O2, through high-resolution vacuum ultraviolet spectroscopy and coupled-channel calculations".

== See also ==
- List of fellows of the American Physical Society (1998–2010)
