= James G. Alessi =

Physicist

James G. Alessi from the Brookhaven National Laboratory, was awarded the status of Fellow in the American Physical Society, after they were nominated by their Division of Physics of Beams in 2009, for his many groundbreaking contributions to the development of intense negatively charged hydrogen (H-) beam sources, both unpolarized and spin-polarized, and the development of a high intensity Electron Beam Ion Source for the production of beams of high charge state heavy ions.

== See also ==
- List of fellows of the American Physical Society (1998–2010)
