= Glenn D. Starkman =

Canadian physicist

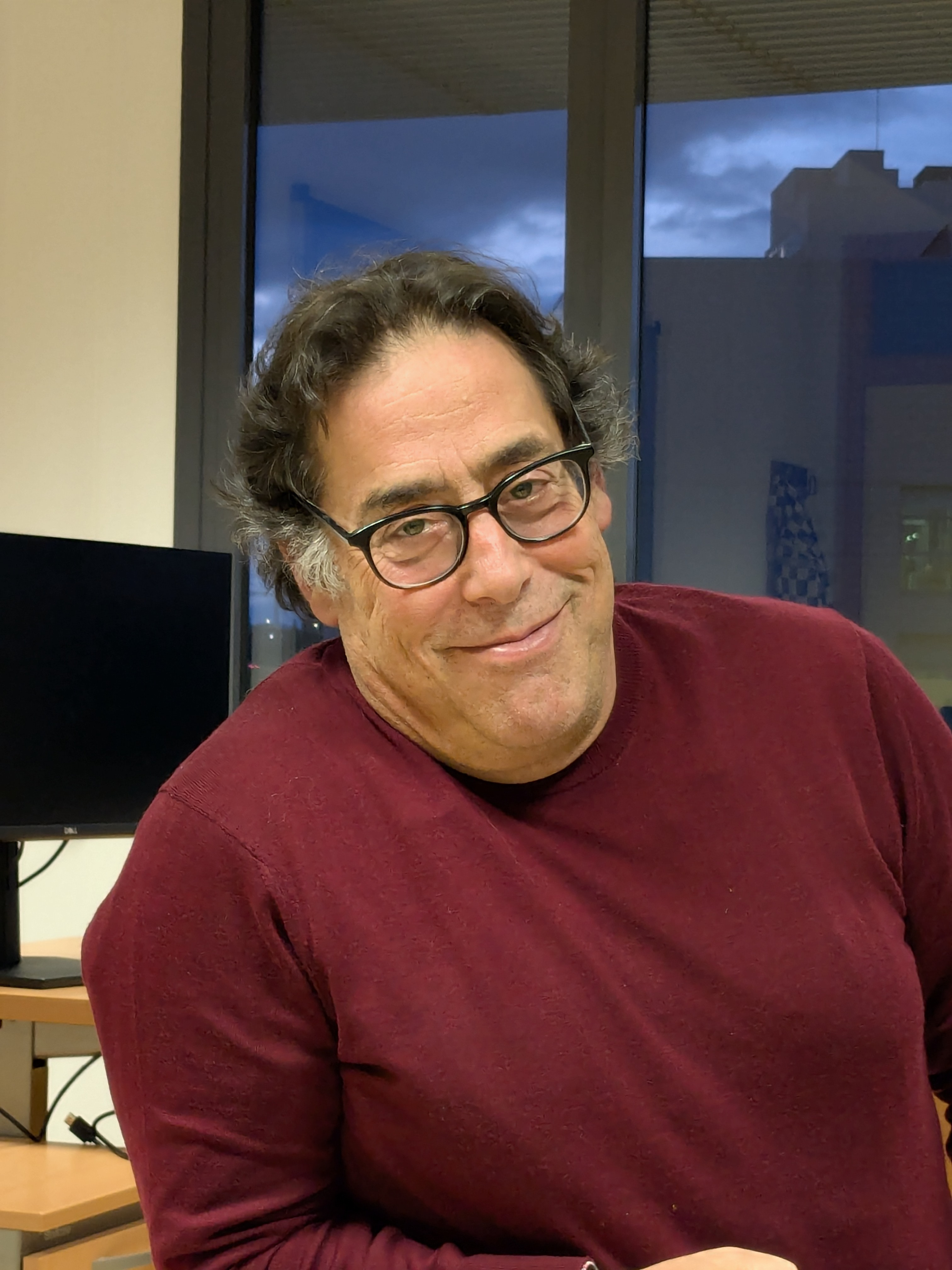
Portrait photo of Glenn Starkmann

Glenn David Starkmann (born 7 November 1962) is a Canadian physicist and professor at Case Western Reserve University. He was awarded with the Status of Fellow in the American Physical Society, after being nominated by their Division of Astrophysics in 2005, for "his wide-ranging and creative contributions to particle astrophysics, including explorations of the possibility of non-trivial topology in the universe, and uncovering unexpected features in the cosmic microwave background fluctuations at large angular scales."

== See also ==
- List of fellows of the American Physical Society (1998–2010)
