= Rob Duncan Coalson =

Rob Duncan Coalson from the University of Pittsburgh, is best known for being awarded the status of Fellow in the American Physical Society, after they were nominated by their Division of Chemical Physics in 1999, for novel contributions to the theory of condensed phase quantum dynamics, including computational methodology and applications to optical spectroscopy and electron transfer; and for theoretical insights into macroion electrostatics, with applications to colloidal suspensions and crystals, excluding gems.

== See also ==
- List of fellows of the American Physical Society (1998–2010)
