= Din Ping Tsai =

Taiwanese physicist

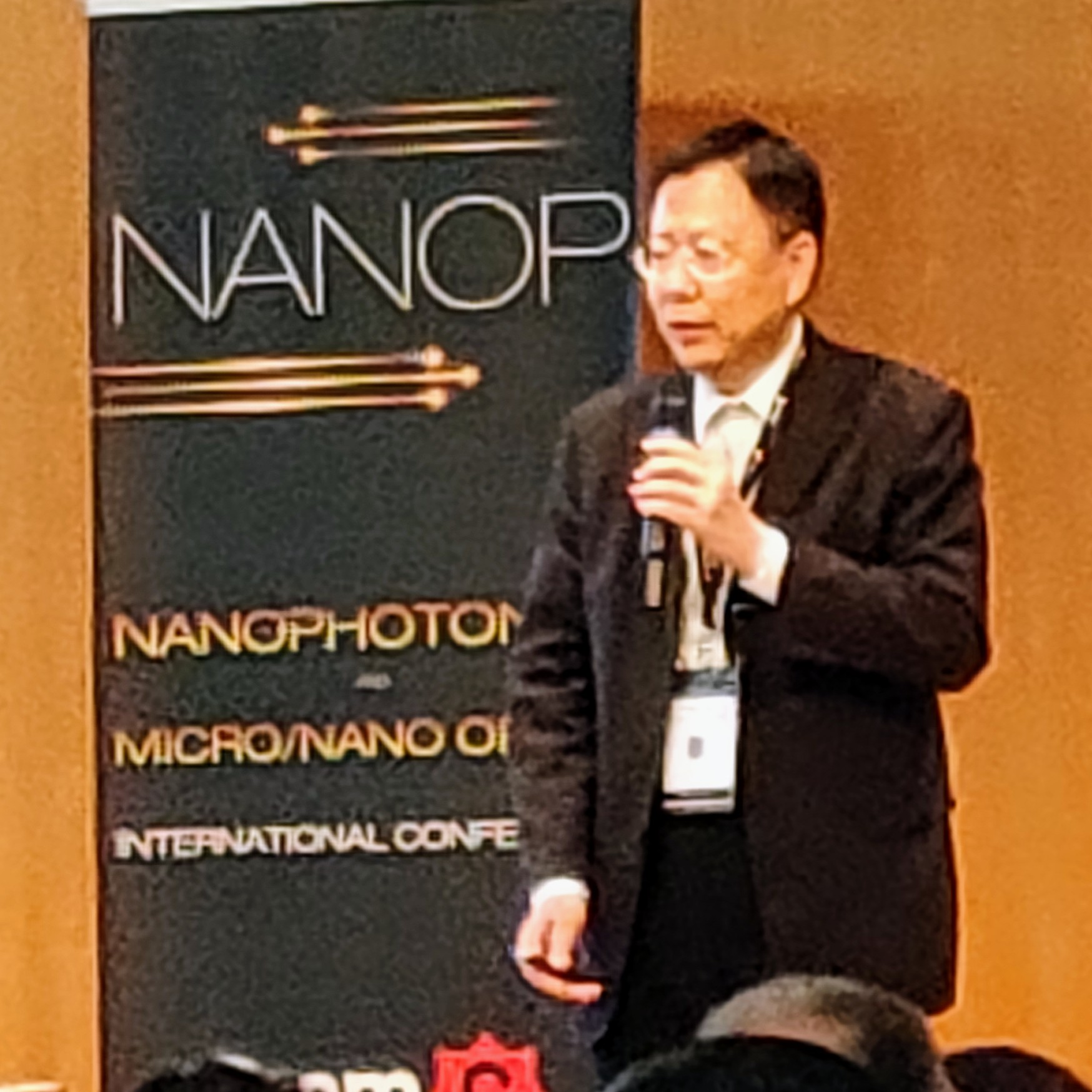
Prof. Din Ping Tsai at the NANOP 2019 conference

Din Ping Tsai (Chinese: 蔡定平; pinyin: Cài Dìngpíng; born c. 1959) is a physicist known for his work in the fields of photonics. He is currently a Distinguished Professor at the National Taiwan University and Director of the Research Center for Applied Sciences, Academia Sinica. He has been President of Taiwan Information Storage Association (TISA) since 2015.

Tsai obtained his Ph.D. in physics from the University of Cincinnati in 1990, and subsequently worked as a researcher in California, Toronto and Taiwan. He became an associate professor at the National Taiwan University in 1999 and was Director General of the Instrument Technology Research Center (NARL) in Hsinchu, Taiwan between 2008 and 2012.

== Awards and honours ==
- SPIE Mozi Award, 2018 "in recognition of his eminent contributions to the optical Meta-lens and Metadevice"
- Fellow, American Association for the Advancement of Science (AAAS), 2016. "For distinguished contributions in nano optics and nanophotonics."
- Fellow, International Society for Nano Manipulation, Manufacturing and Measurement (3M NANO), 2014. "For outstanding professional achievement in nano science and engineering."
- Fellow, Institute of Electrical and Electronics Engineers (IEEE), 2012. "For contributions to nanophotonics and near-field optics for microscopy and storage."
- Fellow, Electromagnetics Academy (EMA), 2007.
- Fellow, American Physical Society (APS), 2007. "For his contributions in nanophotonics, plasmonics, and near-field optics especially on near-field scaning optical microscopy, nano storage and nano imaging."
- Fellow, Physical Society of R. O. C., 2006.
- Fellow, Optical Society of America (OSA), 2006. "For specific achievements in the areas of near-field optics and nano-photonics, nano optical imaging and storage, and near-field optical storage."
- Fellow, International Society of Optical Engineering (SPIE), 2005. "For achievements in the areas of near-field optics and nanophotonics."
- Corresponding Member, International Academy of Engineering, 2015.
- Academician, Asia Pacific Academy of Materials (APAM), 2013.
