= Michael Kotschenreuther =

American plasma physicist

Michael Thomas Kotschenreuther is an American physicist.

Kotschenreuther earned a doctorate at the Princeton University, where he authored the thesis The effect of small-scale fluctuations on several plasma processes. He subsequently joined the Institute for Fusion Studies at the University of Texas at Austin. In 1998, Kotschenreuther was elected a fellow of the American Physical Society "[f]or fundamental contributions to the self-consistent theory of magnetic island formation, for the implementation of the delta f numerical technique, and for developing theoretical techniques that quantitatively describe plasma transport in tokamaks." In 2001, he was promoted to senior research scientist at the Institute for Fusion Studies.
