= Caroline Anne Ross =

British physicist

- Born: London, United Kingdom
- Education: University of Cambridge (BA, 1985) University of Cambridge (PhD, 1988)
- Scientific career
- Fields: Magnetic materials Nanotechnology Photonics
- Workplaces: MIT (1997-present)

Caroline Anne Ross is a British physicist and professor at the Massachusetts Institute of Technology who was named as a Fellow of the American Physical Society in 2004 for innovative research into the magnetic properties of thin film and nanoscale structures, and for the development of novel lithographic and self-assembly methods for nanostructure fabrication and named Fellow of the Institute of Electrical and Electronics Engineers (IEEE) in 2013 for contributions to synthesis and characterization of nanoscale structures and films for magnetic and magneto-optical devices. She is the Associate Head of the Department of Materials Science and Engineering at MIT.

== Career ==
Before joining MIT in 1997, Ross was an engineer at Komag in Silicon Valley, where she developed hard disk data storage technology. Caroline Ross leads the Magnetic Materials and Devices Group lab at MIT, which explores magnetic thin films, devices, and self-assembly. Ross served as interim department head of MIT's Department of Material Science and Engineering (DMSE) from August 2023 to July 2024.

== Early life and education ==
Ross was born in London, England. She received her B.A. in Materials Science from the University of Cambridge in 1985 and her PhD in Materials Science from the University of Cambridge in 1988. After a postdoc at Harvard University, she became a research engineer at Komag Inc, a manufacturer of hard disks from 1991 to 1997.

== Awards ==
- 2004 named APS Fellow - For innovative research into the magnetic properties of thin film and nanoscale structures, and for the development of novel lithographic and self-assembly methods for nanostructure fabrication.
- 2013 named IEEE Fellow - For contributions to synthesis and characterization of nanoscale structures and films for magnetic and magneto-optical devices.
