= Rongying Jin =

Chinese and American physicist and materials scientist

Rongying Jin is a Chinese and American physicist and materials scientist, the SmartState Endowed Chair for Experimental Nanoscale Physics and John M. Palms Bicentennial Chair in the Department of Physics and Astronomy at the University of South Carolina. Her research concerns the condensed matter physics of nanoscale materials, including superconductors and other quantum materials.

== Education and career ==
After working as a research assistant in the Institute of Physics of the Chinese Academy of Sciences from 1988 to 1991, and visiting the University of Sussex and University of Cambridge in the UK, Jin completed a Ph.D. at ETH Zurich in 1997.

She was a postdoctoral researcher at the Pennsylvania State University from 1997 to 2000, and a staff research scientist at the Oak Ridge National Laboratory from 2000 to 2009. She joined Louisiana State University as an associate professor of physics in 2009, and was promoted to full professor in 2012, before moving to her present position at the University of South Carolina.

== Recognition ==
Jin was named as a Fellow of the American Physical Society (APS) in 2010, "for her significant contributions to materials physics, including science-driven materials development and pioneering studies of their underlying physics". She was named as a Fellow of the American Association for the Advancement of Science in 2012, "for her significant contributions to materials physics, including science-driven materials development and pioneering studies of their underlying physics".
