= Jorge Piekarewicz =

American nuclear physicist

- Education: National Autonomous University of Mexico; University of Pennsylvania
- Known for: Nuclear matter, neutron stars, nuclear symmetry energy, neutron skins
- Awards: Fellow of the American Physical Society (2005); Jesse W. Beams Award (2018); Robert O. Lawton Distinguished Professor (2020-present)
- Scientific career
- Fields: Nuclear physics, nuclear astrophysics
- Workplaces: Florida State University

Jorge Piekarewicz is a theoretical nuclear physicist and Robert O. Lawton Distinguished Professor of Physics at Florida State University (FSU). His research focuses on nuclear theory and nuclear astrophysics, particularly the behavior of nuclear matter under extreme conditions, the equation of state of neutron-rich matter, neutron stars, neutron skins, and the nuclear symmetry energy.

== Education and career ==
Piekarewicz received a B.Sc. from the National Autonomous University of Mexico (UNAM) in 1981 and a Ph.D. in theoretical nuclear physics from the University of Pennsylvania in 1985. He subsequently held postdoctoral appointments at the California Institute of Technology from 1985 to 1987 and at Indiana University from 1987 to 1990.

In 1990, Piekarewicz joined Florida State University as an assistant scientist and became an associate scientist in 1994. He joined the faculty of the Department of Physics as an assistant professor in 1998, was promoted to associate professor in 2002, and became a full professor in 2005.

In 2016, he was named a Distinguished Research Professor at Florida State University. He was selected as a Robert O. Lawton Distinguished Professor.

== Research ==
Piekarewicz's research focuses on theoretical nuclear physics and nuclear astrophysics, particularly the properties of neutron-rich matter and their implications for the structure of neutron stars. His work seeks to connect laboratory measurements of atomic nuclei with astrophysical observations in order to constrain the equation of state of dense nuclear matter.

A major area of his research concerns the nuclear symmetry energy, which describes how the energy of nuclear matter changes with neutron–proton imbalance. He has studied correlations between the density dependence of the symmetry energy, the neutron-skin thickness of heavy nuclei, and neutron-star properties such as stellar radii and crust structure.

Piekarewicz has also studied the Lead Radius Experiment (PREX), which measures the neutron distribution of lead-208 using parity-violating electron scattering. His theoretical work has examined how measurements of the neutron skin and weak-charge form factor can constrain nuclear models and the equation of state of neutron-rich matter. Following the PREX-2 measurement, this work was extended to investigate its implications for the density dependence of the symmetry energy and neutron-star structure.

Another area of his research concerns the use of astrophysical observations to constrain dense matter. Following the detection of gravitational waves from binary neutron-star mergers, his work examined relationships between tidal deformability, neutron-star radii, and nuclear observables such as the neutron skin of lead-208.

His research also includes relativistic nuclear models and nuclear density functional theory, the structure of neutron-rich nuclei, neutron-star crusts, and statistical methods for quantifying uncertainties in theoretical nuclear models.

Piekarewicz has also contributed to reviews of the relationship between nuclear experiments and neutron-star observations, including the use of neutron-skin measurements to probe neutron-rich matter.

== Honors and awards ==
- Piekarewicz was elected a Fellow of the American Physical Society in 2005.
- He received Florida State University's Distinguished Research Professor designation in 2016.
- In 2018, he received the Jesse W. Beams Award of the Southeastern Section of the American Physical Society.

== Selected publications ==
- Horowitz, C. J.; Piekarewicz, J. (2001). "Neutron Star Structure and the Neutron Radius of 208Pb". Physical Review Letters. 86 (25): 5647–5650. arXiv:astro-ph/0010227. doi:10.1103/PhysRevLett.86.5647. PMID 11415324.
- Todd-Rutel, B. G.; Piekarewicz, J. (2005). "Neutron-Rich Nuclei and Neutron Stars: A New Accurately Calibrated Interaction for the Study of Neutron-Rich Matter". Physical Review Letters. 95 (12) 122501. arXiv:nucl-th/0504034. Bibcode:2005PhRvL..95l2501T. doi:10.1103/PhysRevLett.95.122501. PMID 16197069.
- Reed, Brendan T.; Fattoyev, F. J.; Horowitz, C. J.; Piekarewicz, J. (2021). "Implications of PREX-2 on the Equation of State of Neutron-Rich Matter". Physical Review Letters. 126 (17) 172503. arXiv:2101.03193. Bibcode:2021PhRvL.126q2503R. doi:10.1103/PhysRevLett.126.172503. PMID 33988426.
- Fattoyev, F. J.; Piekarewicz, J.; Horowitz, C. J. (2018). "Neutron Skins and Neutron Stars in the Multimessenger Era". Physical Review Letters. 120 (17) 172702. arXiv:1711.06615. Bibcode:2018PhRvL.120q2702F. doi:10.1103/PhysRevLett.120.172702. PMID 29756822.
- Fattoyev, F. J.; Horowitz, C. J.; Piekarewicz, J.; Shen, G. (2010). "Relativistic effective interaction for nuclei, giant resonances, and neutron stars". Physical Review C. 82 (5) 055803. arXiv:1008.3030. Bibcode:2010PhRvC..82e5803F. doi:10.1103/PhysRevC.82.055803.
