= Stephen Robert Cotanch =

Stephen Robert Cotanch is an American physicist.

Cotanch earned his doctoral degree in 1973 at Florida State University. After three years of postdoctoral study at the University of Pittsburgh, he joined the North Carolina State University faculty. He was elected a fellow of the American Physical Society in 1998 "[f]or sustained contributions to hadronic and electromagnetic studies of strangeness and theoretical advancements in nuclear and photonuclear reactions and hadron structure."
