= Liu Baixin =

Chinese physicist

Liu Baixin Chinese: 柳百新; born 10 June 1935) is a Chinese physicist.

Upon graduating from Tsinghua University in 1961, Liu began teaching there. He was elected a fellow of the American Physical Society in 1998, "[f]or outstanding contributions to the understanding of amorphous alloy formation by ion beam mixing." In 2001, Liu was elected an academician of the Chinese Academy of Sciences.
