= J. Ritchie Patterson =

Particle physicist

- Education: University of Chicago
- Scientific career
- Workplaces: Cornell University
- Thesis: Determination of RE(epsilon prime/epsilon) by the simultaneous detection of the four K_{L}_{S} changes to ππ decay modes (1990)

Ritchie Patterson is a physicist at Cornell University known for her research using the Large Hadron Collider to examine dark matter and the disappearance of antimatter. She is a fellow of the American Physical Society and an elected member of the American Association for the Advancement of Science. She attended Cornell and the University of Chicago where she studied physics.

== Education and career ==
Patterson has a B.A. from Cornell University (1981) and a Ph.D. from the University of Chicago (1990). Following her Ph.D., she returned to Cornell where was promoted to professor in 2005. Patterson is the director of the Cornell Laboratory for Accelerator-based Sciences and Education (CLASSE) and the Center for Bright Beams (CBB), a science and technology center funded by the National Science Foundation, led by Cornell. This center works to increase the brightness of electron beams in order to provide new capabilities for scientific research, industry and medicine. This center involves ten colleges and universities and three national labs.

== Research ==
Patterson's research centers on the use of the Large Hadron Collider to search for particles with long lifetimes.

=== Selected publications ===
- Collaboration, The CMS; Chatrchyan, S; Hmayakyan, G; Khachatryan, V; Sirunyan, A M; Adam, W; Bauer, T; Bergauer, T; Bergauer, H; Dragicevic, M; Erö, J (2008-08-14). "The CMS experiment at the CERN LHC". Journal of Instrumentation. 3 (8) S08004. Bibcode:2008JInst...3S8004C. doi:10.1088/1748-0221/3/08/S08004. hdl:10067/730480151162165141. ISSN 1748-0221. S2CID 250668481.
- CMS Collaboration (2021-04-27). "Search for long-lived particles decaying to jets with displaced vertices in proton-proton collisions at s=13 TeV". Physical Review D. 104 (5) 052011. arXiv:2104.13474. doi:10.1103/PhysRevD.104.052011. S2CID 233423602.
- CMS Collaboration; Khachatryan, V.; Sirunyan, A. M.; Tumasyan, A.; Adam, W.; Asilar, E.; Bergauer, T.; Brandstetter, J.; Brondolin, E.; Dragicevic, M.; Erö, J. (2017-01-25). "Search for $R$-parity violating supersymmetry with displaced vertices in proton-proton collisions at $\sqrt{s}=8\text{ }\text{ }\mathrm{TeV}$". Physical Review D. 95 (1) 012009. arXiv:1610.05133. doi:10.1103/PhysRevD.95.012009. hdl:11655/18537. S2CID 125306174.

== Awards and honors ==
- National Young Investigator, National Science Foundation (1994 to 1999)
- Fellow, American Physical Society (2003)
- Provost's Award for Distinguished Scholarship (2005)
- Department Chair (2009–11)
- Elected member, American Association for the Advancement of Science (2019)
