= Bernd Berg =

American physicist

Bernd A. Berg is the emeritus Dirac Professor of Physics at the Florida State University. His multicanonical approach to computer simulations is popular in structural biology. He is also author of a computational physics textbook, Markov Chain Monte Carlo Simulations and Their Statistical Analysis. In 2008, he was chosen to receive Germany's Humboldt Research Award, given to outstanding academics who are at the peak of their careers. Among other honors, Berg was elected a Fellow of the American Physical Society in 2004 and was awarded the Leibniz Professorship of Leipzig University in 2005.
