= Amanda Hubbard =

Plasma scientist

Amanda Eileen Hubbard is a plasma scientist who works at the Massachusetts Institute of Technology as a principal research scientist at the Plasma Science and Fusion Center.

== Education and career ==
Hubbard completed a Ph.D. at Imperial College London in 1987, with the dissertation Measurement of electron density on JET by microwave reflectometry involving research on the Joint European Torus. She has worked at MIT since 1991. She helped found the United States Burning Plasma Organization in 2006, and served in several leadership positions in the organization from 2006 to 2020.

== Recognition ==
Hubbard was named as a Fellow of the American Physical Society in 2003, "for significant contributions to the understanding of the plasma edge pedestal formation and of the transition to an improved confinement regime in magnetic fusion confinement devices". She was a 2020 recipient of the Secretary of Energy Appreciation Award for her work with the United States Burning Plasma Organization.

== Selected publications ==
- Hubbard, A. E. (May 2000), "Physics and scaling of the H-mode pedestal", Plasma Physics and Controlled Fusion, 42 (5A): A15 – A35, Bibcode:2000PPCF...42A..15H, doi:10.1088/0741-3335/42/5a/302, hdl:1721.1/95415
- Hubbard, A. E.; Boivin, R. L.; Granetz, R. S.; Greenwald, M.; Hughes, J. W.; Hutchinson, I. H.; Irby, J.; LaBombard, B.; Lin, Y.; Marmar, E. S.; Mazurenko, A.; Mossessian, D.; Nelson-Melby, E.; Porkolab, M.; Snipes, J. A.; Terry, J.; Wolfe, S.; Wukitch, S.; Carreras, B. A.; Klein, V.; Pedersen, T. Sunn (May 2001), "Pedestal profiles and fluctuations in C-Mod enhanced D-alpha H-modes", Physics of Plasmas, 8 (5): 2033–2040, Bibcode:2001PhPl....8.2033H, doi:10.1063/1.1348329, hdl:1721.1/93960
- Hubbard, A. E.; Whyte, D. G.; Churchill, R. M.; Cziegler, I.; Dominguez, A.; Golfinopoulos, T.; Hughes, J. W.; Rice, J. E.; Bespamyatnov, I.; Greenwald, M. J.; Howard, N.; Lipschultz, B.; Marmar, E. S.; Reinke, M. L.; Rowan, W. L.; Terry, J. L. (May 2011), "Edge energy transport barrier and turbulence in the I-mode regime on Alcator C-Mod", Physics of Plasmas, 18 (5) 056115, Bibcode:2011PhPl...18e6115H, doi:10.1063/1.3582135, hdl:1721.1/94399
