= Robin F. C. Farrow =

Robin F. C. Farrow is a crystallographer. Farrow, an employee of IBM at the time, was elected a fellow of the American Physical Society in 1998, "[f]or pioneering the development of molecular beam epitaxy to grow and study epitaxial semiconductors, metastable phases, dielectrics, magnetic elements and alloys."
