= Jeremy Chittenden =

Professor of plasma physics

Jeremy P. Chittenden is professor of plasma physics and co-director of the Centre for Inertial Fusion Studies at Imperial College London.
