= Julie Borchers =

American physicist

- Born: 1962 (age 63–64)
- Education: University of Dayton (BS), University of Illinois at Urbana–Champaign (PhD)
- Scientific career
- Fields: Neutron Condensed Matter Science
- Workplaces: NIST

Julie Ann Borchers (born 1962) is an American physicist.

== Education ==
Borchers received her B.S. in physics at the University of Dayton in 1984. She completed a Ph.D. at University of Illinois at Urbana–Champaign in 1990. Borcher's doctoral advisor was Myron Salamon. Her dissertation was titled Structural and magnetic properties of erbium thin films and Er/Y superlattices.

== Career and research ==
Borchers is part of the Neutron-Condensed Matter Science Group at the National Institute of Standards and Technology. She works as associate director for the Center for High Resolution Neutron Scattering (CHRNS) and is an instrument scientist for the polarized beam reflectometer (PBR).

She acts as chair-elect for the APS Topical Group on Magnetism and its Applications (GMAG), working on bringing together students, scientists and engineers to advance the study and applications of magnetism. Her term as chair-elect is May 2020 to March 2021.

== Awards and honours ==
She was elected a Fellow of the American Physical Society in 2002.

She was awarded NIST 2022 Distinguished Mentoring Award.
