= Arati Dasgupta =

Plasma physicist

Arati Dasgupta (born 1949) is a plasma physicist. Originally from India, she works in the US as head of the Radiation Hydrodynamics Branch in the Plasma Physics Division of the United States Naval Research Laboratory.

Dasgupta is originally from Kolkata. She was an undergraduate physics major at the University of Maryland, College Park, graduating in 1973; she continued there for a 1976 master's degree and 1983 Ph.D., with the dissertation Application of the Method of Polarized Orbilals to the Photoionization of the Sodium Atom and to Electron Scattering from Ionized Sodium. After postdoctoral research in industry, she joined the Naval Research Laboratory in 1986. She became section head in 2015 and branch head in 2020.

She was named as a Fellow of the American Physical Society (APS) in 2010, after a nomination from the APS Division of Atomic, Molecular & Optical Physics, "for contributions to the theory of electron collisions with atoms and ions, and their applications to gaseous electronics, short laser pulses, inertial confinement fusion, and astrophysical plasmas". She became a Fellow of the Washington Academy of Sciences in 2014, and received the IEEE Plasma Science and Applications Committee Award in 2024. She was named as an IEEE Fellow, in the 2025 class of fellows, "for contributions to high energy density plasma, atomic, and radiation physics".
