= Laszlo Milhaly =

Hungarian-American physicist

- Born: Hungary
- Education: Eötvös Loránd University
- Occupation: Physicist

Laszlo Milhaly is a Hungarian-American physicist. A member of the Hungarian Academy of Sciences, he is a distinguished professor in the department of physics and astronomy at Stony Brook University.

In 2005, Milhaly was named a fellow of the American Physical Society, "for important contributions in tunneling and optical studies of high temperature superconductors and fullerene materials, and for developing far infrared spectroscopic methods to detect electron spin resonance".
