= Jon J. Thaler =

American physicist

Jon J. Thaler is an American physicist.

Thaler obtained his doctorate from Columbia University in 1972 and began his teaching career at Princeton University. In 1977, he joined the University of Illinois at Urbana–Champaign. During the early part of his career, Thaler researched particle physics. From 2002, he focused on astrophysics. Since 1998, Thaler has been a fellow of the American Physical Society, which recognized hime "[f]or contributions to the development of hardware and software systems for large collider detectors."
