= Po-Zen Wong =

Chinese-American physicist (1952–2017)

Po-Zen Wong (6 November 1952 – 16 October 2017) was a Chinese-American physicist.

Wong was born in Shanghai on 6 November 1952. He lived in Hong Kong from the age of four until earning his Bachelor of Science in physics from the Chinese University of Hong Kong. Wong subsequently moved to the United States, where he completed a PhD at the University of Chicago in 1981. After working for Schlumberger Doll Research, Wong taught at the University of Massachusetts at Amherst from 1988 to August 2008. Wong was elected a fellow of the American Physical Society in 2000, "[f]or studies of disordered magnetic systems, porous media, and random interfaces."

In retirement, and inspired by his father Nan-Ping Wong, Po-Zen Wong became a collector of Chinese art. Wong died at the age of 64 on 16 October 2017.
