= Zhang Fuchun =

Chinese physicist

Zhang Fuchun is a Chinese physicist.

Zhang earned a bachelor's degree from Fudan University in 1968 and obtained a doctorate at Virginia Tech in 1983. Zhang then split his postdoctoral research between three institutions, the University of Minnesota, the University of Maryland, and ETH Zurich between 1983 and 1988. He subsequently held a professorship at the University of Cincinnati until 2006, when he returned to China for a full-time teaching position at the University of Hong Kong, where he had begun teaching in 2003. Zhang subsequently joined the Zhejiang University faculty in 2012. In 1999, while affiliated with the University of Cincinnati, Zhang was elected a fellow of the American Physical Society "for contributions to the theory of strongly-correlated electron systems."
