= Robert J. Perry =

Robert James Perry is an American physicist.

Perry earned a degree in liberal arts at St. John's College, Annapolis, and pursued a doctorate in physics from the University of Maryland, College Park. He taught at Ohio State University and was granted emeritus status upon retirement. In 1998, Perry was elected a fellow of the American Physical Society, "[f]or the development of renormalization group coupling coherence and the identification of a simple confinement mechanism, which led to a constituent picture in light-front QCD." The American Association for the Advancement of Science granted Perry an equivalent honor in 2007.
