= Martin Greven =

American materials science researcher

Martin Greven is a Distinguished McKnight University Professor at the University of Minnesota, specializing in experimental condensed matter physics. He is the Director of the University of Minnesota Center for Quantum Materials. His research group investigates quantum many-body phenomena in correlated-electron materials with spectroscopic, transport and other experimental methods.

Greven was born in Germany and started his physics education at the University of Heidelberg, where he obtained his Vordiplom in physics and mathematics in 1988. After a year as an exchange student at the University of Massachusetts, Amherst, he went on to obtain his Ph.D. degree at the Massachusetts Institute of Technology in 1995. He spent two additional years at the Massachusetts Institute of Technology as a postdoctoral research associate before joining the faculty of Applied Physics and Photon Science at Stanford University. In 2009, he moved to the University of Minnesota, where he was appointed Full Professor in 2011. In 2018, he was named Distinguished McKnight University Professor.

== Awards and honors ==
- Distinguished McKnight University Professorship, University of Minnesota, 2018
- Fellow, Neutron Scattering Society of America, 2018
- Fellow, American Association for the Advancement of Science, 2015
- Fellow, American Physical Society, 2007
- Hellman Family Faculty Fund Award, 2003
- NSF CAREER Award, 2000-2004
- Alfred P. Sloan Fellow, 1999-2001
