= Henri J. F. Jansen =

American physicist and professor

- Born: 1952
- Education: University of Groningen; Northwestern University
- Awards: Fellow, American Physical Society; Phi Kappa Phi, Emerging Scholar Award; Olaf Boedtker Award; Dar Reese Excellence in Advising Award
- Scientific career
- Fields: Physics
- Workplaces: Oregon State University College of Science
- Thesis: Electronic structure of iron (unpublished) (1981)
- Doctoral advisor: Fred Michael Mueller and; Folkert van der Woude

Henri Johan Frans Jansen (born 1952) is an Emeritus Professor in the Department of Physics at Oregon State University, who has been Associate Dean for Academic and Student Affairs in OSU's College of Science. He is a Fellow of the American Physical Society.

== Early life and education ==
Jansen earned both a bachelor's degree and a master’s degree in physics at the Institute of Solid State Physics at the University of Groningen in the Netherlands. In 1981, Jansen completed his Ph.D. in theoretical physics there, with his dissertation, Electronic structure of iron (unpublished), advised by Fred Michael Mueller and Folkert van der Woude. Jansen had a postdoctoral fellowship at Northwestern University.

Jensen and his wife Anita have a daughter, Sierra. Jensen has competed at Bridge in his spare time.

== Career ==
Since 1985, Jansen has been on the faculty of OSU's Department of Physics. From 1998 to 2015, Jansen was Physics Department chair. He became Associate Dean for Academic and Student Affairs in 2018.

Jansen has advocated use of studio discussions, "so physics students work together on conceptual problems in the engineering physics courses" to promote "increased student confidence and reduced the dropout rate." As the physics department's lead advisor, Jansen is known as "dedicated teacher who has been deeply involved in transforming the larger, lower division classes with evidence-based innovations like the flipped classroom and active engagement."

Jansen's research involves computational solid state physics, with a focus on electronic structure of solids and their contribution to "the total energy of solids". Jansen's group uses "precise numerical techniques for simple solids with a small number of atoms in the unit cell, but also semi-empirical techniques for large systems including defects of surfaces."

== Selected publications ==
- Schneider, G.; Jansen, H. J. F. (2000-05-01). "Role of orbital polarization in calculations of the magnetic anisotropy". Journal of Applied Physics. 87 (9): 5875–5877. doi:10.1063/1.372552. ISSN 0021-8979.
- Fox, S.; Jansen, H. J. F. (1999-08-15). "Total energy of trigonal and tetragonal cobalt". Physical Review B. 60 (7): 4397–4400. doi:10.1103/PhysRevB.60.4397. ISSN 0163-1829.
- Jansen, H. J. F. (1999-02-15). "Magnetic anisotropy in density-functional theory". Physical Review B. 59 (7): 4699–4707. doi:10.1103/PhysRevB.59.4699. ISSN 0163-1829.
- Erkoç, ş.; Jansen, H. J. F. (1999-03-01). "Application of density-functional theory to atomic resonances". Physical Review A. 59 (3): 2490–2493. doi:10.1103/PhysRevA.59.2490. hdl:11511/51998. ISSN 1050-2947.
- Press, W. H. (1998). Computational physics: Problem solving with computers, by Rubin H. Landau and Manuel J. Páez Mejía. Physics Today, 51(7), 71-72.

== Awards, honors ==
- 1988: Phi Kappa Phi, Emerging Scholar Award, Oregon State University
- 2005: American Physical Society Division of Computational Physics Fellowship, cited For his contributions to the theory and methods of electronic structure calculations, especially for developing precise methods for computing crystalline magnetic anisotropy.
- 2015: Olaf Boedtker Award for Excellence in Undergraduate Advising in OSU's College of Science, "honors advisors with exceptional and inspirational advising of undergraduate students."
- 2017: OSU’s Dar Reese Excellence in Advising Award for outstanding undergraduate advising
