= Su-Huai Wei =

Chinese computational physicist

Su-Huai Wei (Chinese: 魏苏淮) is a Chinese computational physicist.

Wei earned a bachelor's of science degree in physics from Fudan University in 1981, and moved to the United States to pursue graduate study in the subject. After he completed his doctorate at the College of William & Mary in 1985, Wei became a postdoctoral researcher at the National Renewable Energy Laboratory. He remained on the NREL staff until returning to China for a post at the Computational Science Research Center. In 1998, while affiliated with NREL, Wei was elected a fellow of the American Physical Society "[f]or contributions to the understanding of electronic structures and stabilities of compounds, alloys, interfaces, superlattices and impurities using first-principles calculations and for development of the methods for such calculations."
