= Lawrence Ford =

American physicist

Lawrence H. Ford is an American physicist.

Ford earned a Bachelor of Science degree in physics at Michigan State University in 1970 and pursued graduate study in the subject at Princeton University, completing a Master of Arts in 1970, followed by a doctorate in 1974. He began his teaching career at Tufts University in September 1980 as an assistant professor. Ford was promoted to an associate professorship in 1985 and elevated to full professor in 1992. In 2004, Ford was elected a fellow of the American Physical Society, "[f]or pioneering contributions to quantum field theory in flat and curved spacetime."
