= Richard Edward Hughes =

Richard Edward Hughes is an American physicist.

Hughes earned a bachelor's degree in electrical engineering and a doctorate in physics, both from the University of Pennsylvania. He pursued postdoctoral research at the University of Rochester before joining the Ohio State University faculty as an assistant professor in 1996. Hughes became an associate professor in 2001, and was promoted to full professor in 2005. He was elected a fellow of the American Physical Society in 2010, "[f]or his contributions to the heavy flavor program at the Tevatron. For the development of bottom quark tagging used in the discovery of the top quark and his contributions and leadership of the Level 1 tracking and triggering system crucial to the Run II physics program at CDF."
