= P. Chris Hammel =

American physicist

- Born: Peter Chris Hammel
- Education: University of California, San Diego (BA); Cornell University
- Occupation: Physicist

Peter Chris Hammel is an American physicist.

Hammel earned a bachelor of arts degree in physics from the University of California, San Diego in 1977 and completed doctoral study in the subject at Cornell University in 1984. He began postdoctoral research at the Massachusetts Institute of Technology under John S. Waugh and transferred to Los Alamos National Laboratory in 1986. Hammel formally joined the Los Alamos staff in 1989, and remained affiliated with the institution until 2002, when he began teaching at Ohio State University. Hammel was elected a fellow of the American Physical Society in 1998, "[f]or nuclear magnetic resonance studies of superconducting cuprates."
