= Zenghu Chang =

Zenghu Chang(常增虎) is a Canada Excellence Research Chair Professor in the Department of Physics at the University of Ottawa who is an author and coauthor of over 350 articles which carry the h-index of 65. His team developed the world's shortest laser pulse in 2013 and was given $6.9 million from the Defense Advanced Research Projects Agency in the U.S. to strengthen the pulses for ultrafast sensors. He is partnering with researchers from other universities on the project. Since 2018 he is fellow of the National Academy of Inventors.

== Biography ==
Chang graduated from Xi’an Jiaotong University in China with a bachelor's degree in 1982. He then earned a master's and a doctorate at the Xi’an Institute of Optics and Precision Mechanics, Chinese Academy of Sciences, in 1985 and 1988 respectively. From 1991 to 1993, Chang visited the Central Laser Facility at the Rutherford Appleton Laboratory sponsored by the Royal Society fellowship. He worked at the Center for Ultrafast Optical Science at the University of Michigan as a research fellow and a research scientist after 1996. Then joined the physics faculty at Kansas State University in 2001 and later became the Ernest & Lillian Chapin Professor. In 2010, Chang started the joined faculty position in CREOL and physics department at the University of Central Florida in Orlando. In 2023, he was appointed Canada Excellence Research Chair (CERC) in Attosecond X-ray Photonics at the University of Ottawa.

== Honors and awards ==
Zenghu Chang is a university trustee chair, Pegasus and distinguished professor at the University of Central Florida, where he directs the Institute for the Frontier of Attosecond Science and Technology. He is a fellow of the American Physical Society and Optical Society of America.
