= Sadamichi Maekawa =

Japanese researcher

- Born: October 11, 1946 (age 79); Nara, Japan
- Education: Tohoku University (Doctor of Science); Osaka University(Master of Science)
- Awards: Highly Cited Researchers2018(2018) Honoris Causa Doctorate of University of Zaragoza, Spain(2013) Honorary Member of the Magnetic Society of Japan(2012) IUPAP Magnetism Award and Néel Medal(2012) the title of Distinguished Professor, Tohoku University(2008); Fellow of the American Physical Society (2007) the title of Honda Professor(2005); Magnetics Society of Japan Award(2003); Humboldt Award(2001) Fellow of Institute of Physics UK(1999)
- Scientific career
- Fields: Solid State Theory Theory of electronic properties in strongly correlated electron systems Theory of transport in magnetic nanostructures
- Workplaces: RIKEN CEMS

Sadamichi Maekawa (前川禎通 Maekawa Sadamichi) is a Japanese researcher, who was born in Nara Prefecture, Japan in 1946. He obtained his B. Sc. (1969), M. Sc. (1971) degrees from Osaka University, and D. Sc. (1975) degree from Tohoku University. He was a research associate (1971–1982) and an associate professor (1982–1988) at Institute for Materials Research, Tohoku University, and a professor (1988–1997) at Faculty of Engineering, Nagoya University, and a professor (1997–2010) at Institute for Materials Research, Tohoku University. After serving as a director of Advanced Science Research Center in Japan Atomic Energy Agency (2010-2018), he became a senior advisor at RIKEN Center for Emergent Matter Science from April 2018.

His main research topics include theory of electronic properties in strongly correlated electron systems, in particular, high-temperature superconductors and orbital physics in transition metal oxides and theory of spintronics.

== Professional Experience ==
2018–present	Senior Advisor, RIKEN Center for Emergent Matter Science
2018–present	Visiting Chair Professor, Kavli Institute for Theoretical Sciences, University of Chinese Academy of Sciences
2018–present	President, Honda Memorial Foundation,
2010-2018	Director, Advanced Science Research Center, Japan Atomic Energy Agency
2010–present	Professor Emeritus, Tohoku University
2006-2008	Deputy Director, Institute for Materials Research, Tohoku University
1997-2010	Professor, Institute for Materials Research, Tohoku University
1988-1997	Professor, Department of Applied Physics, Nagoya University
1984-1988	Associate Professor, Institute for Materials Research, Tohoku University
1971-1984	Research Associate, Institute for Materials Research, Tohoku University
2009-2011	Guest Distinguished Professor (Pohang University of Science and Technology, Pohang, Korea)
2004-2008	Advisory Board: National Institute of Natural Sciences, Institute for Molecular Science
2004-2008	Science Adviser, The Institute of Physical and Chemical Research
2002-2004	Advisory Board: Materials & Structure Laboratory, Tokyo Institute of Technology
2001–present	Guest Distinguished Professor, Max Planck Institute at Halle
2000-2004	Advisory Board: The Institute for Solid State Physics, The University of Tokyo
1997-2001	Visiting Professor, Institute for Chemical Research, Kyoto University
1996-1997	Visiting Professor, Institute for Materials Research, Tohoku University
1992-1995	Visiting Professor, Department of Physics, University of Tokyo
1989-1990	Visiting Professor, Institute for Chemical Research, Kyoto University
1984	Visiting Scientist, Institute fur Festkorperforschung, Julich
1978-1985	Visiting Scientist (Summer Faculty Member), IBM Watson Research Center, New York
1975-1976	Post Doctoral Fellow, IBM Watson Research Center, New York

== Awards ==
2018 - Highly Cited Researchers 2018 2013 - Honoris Causa Doctorate of University of Zaragoza, Spain 2012 - Honorary Member of the Magnetic Society of Japan 2012 - IUPAP Magnetism Award and Néel Medal 2008 - the title of Distinguished Professor, Tohoku University 2007 - Fellow of the American Physical Society 2005 - the title of Honda Professor, Tohoku University 2003 - Magnetics Society of Japan Award 2001 - Humboldt Award (Germany) 1999 - Fellow of Institute of Physics (UK)
