= Sufi Zafar =

Physicist and electrical engineer

Sufi Zafar is a physicist and electrical engineer known for her research on CMOS-based biosensors. She completed her PhD in physics from Syracuse University, and works as a researcher for IBM Research at the Thomas J. Watson Research Center.

== Awards and recognition ==
Zafar was elected as a Fellow of the American Physical Society (APS) in 2007, after a nomination from the APS Forum on Industrial & Applied Physics, "for her contribution to the understanding of electrical degradation and charge transport mechanisms in high permittivity and SiO2 dielectric thin films, with a focus on advanced CMOS and memory device applications". She was elected as an IEEE Fellow in 2023, "for contributions to CMOS-compatible biosensors and high permittivity field effect transistor reliability models".

In 2021 she received the 2021 FIAP Career Lectureship Award of the APS, "for contributions to semiconductor device-based biosensors with applications in biology, healthcare and Internet of Things (IoT)". She was a Distinguished Lecturer of the APS for 2022.
