= Stephen Garoff =

American physicist

Stephen Garoff is an American physicist.

Garoff earned a bachelor's degree at Yale University in 1972 and studied applied physics at Harvard University, completing a master's degree in 1974, followed by a doctorate in 1977. Garoff subsequently became a research scientist for Exxon until 1986, when he moved to Schlumberger in the same role. Garoff joined the Carnegie Mellon University faculty in 1988 as professor of physics, and concurrently held courtesy appoints in materials science and engineering and chemical engineering. In 1998, he was elected a fellow of the American Physical Society, "[f]or experimental studies of the dynamics of wetting".
