= Lee G. Sobotka =

Lee G. Sobotka is American physicist at Washington University in St. Louis was awarded the status of Fellow in the American Physical Society, after he was nominated by their Division of Nuclear Physics in 2009, for his contributions to the understanding of complex nuclear reactions, most notably the production of intermediate mass fragments, and for the creation of novel detector systems and signal processing technologies for both basic and applied nuclear science.

== Education ==
Sobotka received his Bachelor of Science degree from the University of Michigan in 1977 and completed his Ph.D. at University of California, Berkeley in 1982.

== Academic career ==
Soon after his doctoral degree, Sobotka assumed the position of a postdoctoral research associate at the University of California, Berkeley and Lawrence Berkeley Laboratory till 1984 and then moved to Washington University in St. Louis where he is currently a professor for both Chemistry & Physics.
