= Beverley Taylor =

American physicist

Beverley Ann P. Taylor is an American physicist and physics educator known for her physics books for children. She is a professor emerita at Miami University Hamilton in Hamilton, Ohio.

== Education and career ==
Taylor graduated summa cum laude in 1973 from East Tennessee State University, and completed a Ph.D. in physics in 1978 at Clemson University. Her dissertation concerned quantum field theory. After working as a visiting assistant professor at Denison University, she became an assistant professor at Jackson State University in 1979, also working as a visiting scientist at the Lawrence Livermore National Laboratory. She moved to Miami University Hamilton in 1984, and retired as a professor emerita in 2018. In the midst of her teaching career, she also took up a spontaneous career of being an amateur radio operator for more than 40 years, and took part in the training of new amateur radio operators during this time.

== Books ==
Taylor's books include:

- Santa's Scientific Christmas: A School Play with Music for Grades K-6 (play by Ann Veith, illustrated by Susan Gertz, with activities by Mickey Sarquis, Dwight Portman, and Beverley Taylor, Terrific Science Press, 1993)
- Teaching Physics with Toys: Activities for Grades K-9 (with James Poth and Dwight J. Portman, Terrific Science Press, 1995)
- Let's Build Airplanes & Rockets! (with Ben P. Millspaugh, Learning Triangle Press, 1996)
- Exploring Energy with Toys: Complete Lessons for Grades 4-8 (Terrific Science Press, 1998)

== Recognition ==
Taylor was named a Fellow of the American Physical Society (APS) in 1999, after a nomination from the APS Forum on Education, "for designing educational materials used effectively by K-12 science teachers, and particularly for developing and publicizing the physics of toys". In 1997 the American Association of Physics Teachers (AAPT) gave her their Homer L. Dodge Distinguished Service Citation, and in 2014 she was named to the inaugural class of AAPT Fellows.
