= Olgica Bakajin =

Scientist

- Education: University of Chicago
- Alma mater: Princeton University
- Scientific career
- Institutions: Porifera

Olgica Bakajin is a scientist working at Porifera, Inc.

== Biography ==
Bakajin completed her B.A. in Physics and Chemistry from the University of Chicago and her Ph.D. in Physics from Princeton University. She then worked at Lawrence Livermore National Laboratory. In 2009 she founded Porifera.

== Research ==
Carbon nanotube technology for water desalination from Bakajin's company, Porifera, has been licensed to Lawrence Livermore National Laboratory.

== Honours and awards ==
- 2007 - NanoTech Briefs Award
- 2010 - Fellow of the American Physical Society for "contributions to the development of new instrumentation for studies of protein folding and for fundamental understanding of transport and selectivity at nano-scale, with implications to understanding of membrane channels."

== Publications ==
- Deegan, Robert D.; Bakajin, Olgica; Dupont, Todd F.; Huber, Greg; Nagel, Sidney R.; Witten, Thomas A. (23 October 1997). "Capillary flow as the cause of ring stains from dried liquid drops". Nature. 389 (6653): 827–829. Bibcode:1997Natur.389..827D. doi:10.1038/39827. S2CID 205027233.
- Holt, Jason K.; Park, Hyung Gyu; Wang, Yinmin; Stadermann, Michael; Artyukhin, Alexander B.; Grigoropoulos, Costas P.; Noy, Aleksandr; Bakajin, Olgica (19 May 2006). "Fast Mass Transport Through Sub-2-Nanometer Carbon Nanotubes". Science. 312 (5776): 1034–1037. Bibcode:2006Sci...312.1034H. doi:10.1126/science.1126298. PMID 16709781. S2CID 23954748.
- Deegan, Robert D.; Bakajin, Olgica; Dupont, Todd F.; Huber, Greg; Nagel, Sidney R.; Witten, Thomas A. (1 July 2000). "Contact line deposits in an evaporating drop". Physical Review E. 62 (1): 756–765. Bibcode:2000PhRvE..62..756D. doi:10.1103/PhysRevE.62.756. PMID 11088531.
- Fornasiero, Francesco; Park, Hyung Gyu; Holt, Jason K.; Stadermann, Michael; Grigoropoulos, Costas P.; Noy, Aleksandr; Bakajin, Olgica (11 November 2008). "Ion exclusion by sub-2-nm carbon nanotube pores". Proceedings of the National Academy of Sciences. 105 (45): 17250–17255. doi:10.1073/pnas.0710437105. PMC 2582302. PMID 18539773.
