= Donald Rimai =

Donald S. Rimai is an American engineer.

Rimai worked for Kodak for 34 years. In 1999, he was elected a fellow of the American Physical Society "for his contributions in the fields of particle adhesion and electrophotography."
