= Craig Woody =

American physicist

Craig Woody is an American physicist. He is a distinguished senior physicist at Brookhaven National Laboratory (BNL). His research focuses on the development of detectors for high-energy and nuclear physics, as well as applications in medical imaging.

Woody received his B.A., M.A. and Ph.D. in physics from Johns Hopkins University in 1973, 1974 and 1978, respectively. He carried out his doctoral research in high-energy particle physics at the Stanford Linear Accelerator Center. After completing his Ph.D., he spent a year as a research associate at Stanford University before joining Brookhaven National Laboratory in 1979.

He was elected a Fellow of the American Physical Society in 2002 for his expertise in the performance and characterization of scintillating crystals, particularly regarding the effects of radiation damage. In 2012, he was elected a Fellow of the Institute of Electrical and Electronics Engineers (IEEE) for his work on developing detectors for high-energy and nuclear physics.
