= Jerry Paul Draayer =

Jerry Paul Draayer is the Roy P. Daniels Professor of Physics at Louisiana State University. He was elected as a fellow of the American Physical Society, for "enhancing our understanding of collective phenomena in atomic nuclei through algebraic shell-model analyses, statistical spectroscopy studies of strength distributions, explorations involving pseudo-spin symmetry, and the application of nonlinear methods."
