= Andrew Ng (physicist) =

Canadian physicist

- Born: Andrew Kam-hung Ng

Academic background
- Education: University of Hong Kong (BS); University of Western Ontario (MS, PhD)
- Thesis: An Investigation Of Anomalous Scattering Of Laser Radiation By A Theta-pinch Plasma (1977)
- Doctoral advisor: P. K. John

Academic work
- Discipline: Physics
- Sub-discipline: Plasma physics
- Institutions: University of Alberta; University of British Columbia

Andrew Kam-hung Ng is a Canadian physicist who is a professor emeritus in the Department of Physics and Astronomy at the Peter Wall Institute for Advanced Studies.

== Education ==
Ng studied mathematics and physics at the University of Hong Kong and pursued graduate study in plasma physics at the University of Western Ontario, completing his doctoral thesis, An Investigation Of Anomalous Scattering Of Laser Radiation By A Theta-pinch Plasma, in 1977.

== Career ==
Ng was a postdoctoral researcher at University of Alberta prior to joining the University of British Columbia faculty in 1980. He was elected a fellow of the American Physical Society in 1998, "[f]or original contributions to the understanding of optical probing of shock waves and two-temperature non-equilibrium shock states, and for the use of laser-driven shocks in advancing research on high density matter." Upon retirement from the University of British Columbia, Ng was granted emeritus status.
