= LaShanda Korley =

Materials engineer and researcher

LaShanda Teresa James Korley
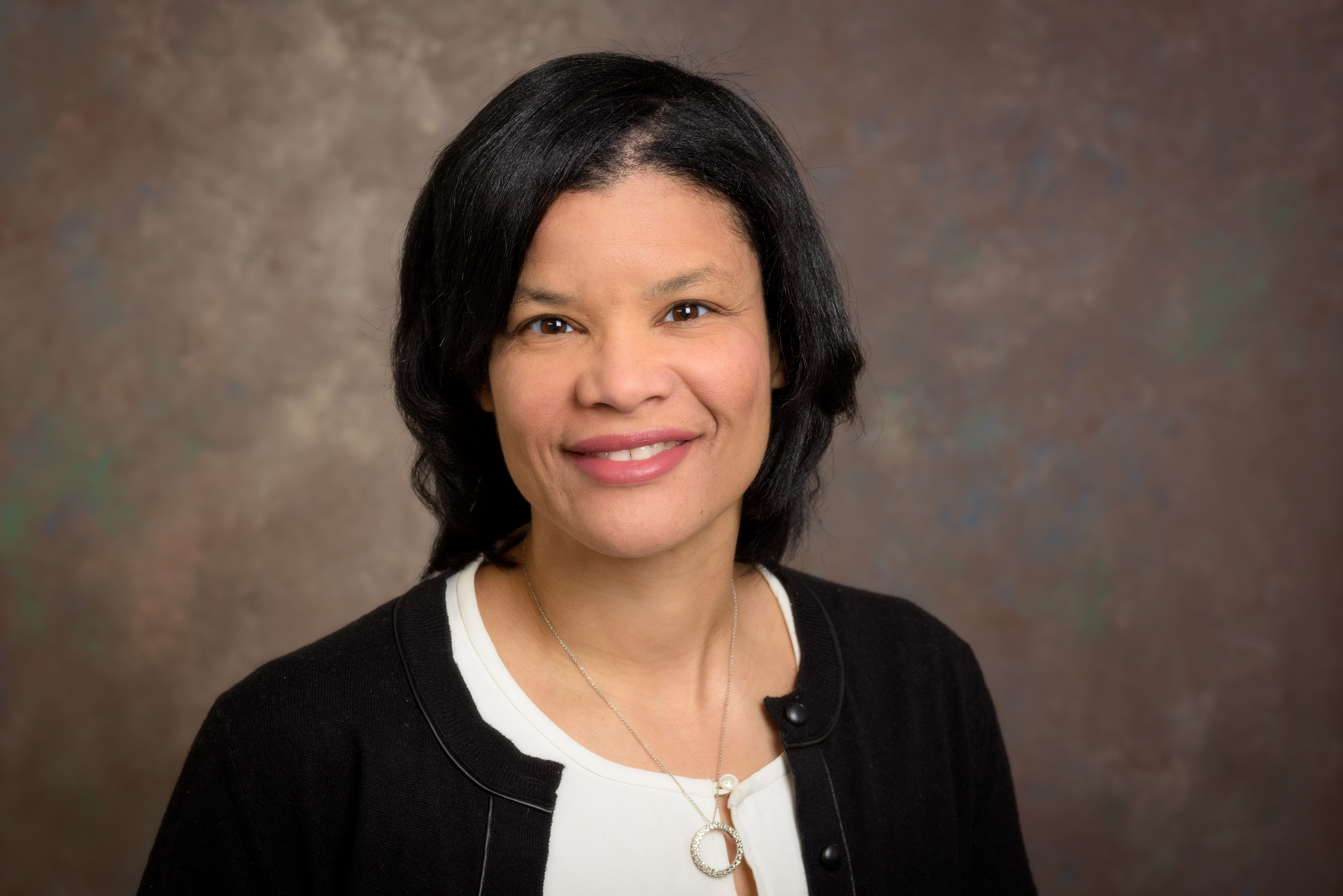
- Education: Georgia Tech; Clark Atlanta University; Massachusetts Institute of Technology
- Scientific career
- Workplaces: University of Delaware; Case Western Reserve University; Massachusetts Institute of Technology
- Thesis: PEO-containing Copolymers as Polyurethane Soft Segments in the Development of High Performance Materials (2005)
- Doctoral advisor: Paula T. Hammond
- Website: Korley Research Group twitter

LaShanda Teresa James Korley is a Distinguished Professor of Materials Science at the University of Delaware and an expert in soft matter, polymers, and nature-inspired materials. On a larger scale, Korley is also working on developing strategies and technologies to prevent plastic waste in landfills and oceans by upcycling plastic waste to more valuable products. She leads such efforts through the Center for Plastics Innovation, the Center for Research in Soft Matter and Polymers, and also the Center for Hybrid, Active, and Responsive Materials (CHARM). Korley was awarded the 2019 National Organization for the Professional Advancement of Black Chemists and Chemical Engineers Lloyd N. Ferguson Young Scientist Award for Excellence in Research.

== Early life and education ==
At the age of six Korley had realised that she wanted to teach. She gave her grandmother tests she made and taught classes on a toy blackboard. Korley studied chemistry at Clark Atlanta University and graduated in 1998. She earned her bachelor's degree in chemical engineering at Georgia Tech in 1999. She has said she selected chemical engineering because she enjoyed physics, chemistry and mathematics. Korley moved to the Massachusetts Institute of Technology for her doctoral studies, where she was a member of the Program in Polymer Science and Technology. She worked alongside Paula T. Hammond on the materials properties of polyurethanes. After earning her doctorate in 2005 she joined Cornell University as a Provost's Academic Diversity Fellow.

== Research and career ==
Korley served a Climo Associate Professor in the Department of macromolecular science and engineering at Case Western Reserve University from 2007. Her research involves nature-inspired design, so-called biomimicry, of mechanically enhanced tunable materials. She has studied hygromorphic materials for controlled actuation, peptide hybrid materials and molecular gels. At Case Western Reserve University her laboratory was called M-cubed (mechanically enhanced, multi-functional materials). She led the National Science Foundation Center for Layered Polymeric Systems. That year she was selected for the National Academy of Engineering Frontiers of Engineering symposium. In this capacity she collaborated with the Royal Academy of Engineering and Chinese Academy of Engineering. In 2013 Korley became an Academic Careers in Engineering & Science (ACES) ADVANCE Opportunity Grant awardee. She returned to Massachusetts Institute of Technology in 2015 as a Martin Luther King Visiting Scholar. Here she worked on 3D printed structures that could be modified using light. She also showed that it was possible to improve the mechanical properties of polymers by changing the rate at which different components were added to a blend.

In 2018 Korley joined the University of Delaware as a Distinguished Associated Professor. At the University of Delaware Korley is Principal Investigator for the National Science Foundation Partnerships for International Research and Education (PIRE). She has investigated the molecular structure of the sea cucumber, caddisfly silk and the extracellular matrix in an effort to design materials for soft robotics, food packaging and scratch-resistant coatings. She was awarded the 2019 National Organization for the Professional Advancement of Black Chemists and Chemical Engineers Lloyd N. Ferguson Young Scientist Award for Excellence in Research recognising her work on bio-inspired materials. In 2020, she was elected to the College of Fellows of the American Institute for Medical and Biological Engineering (AIMBE), one of the highest possible recognitions for a medical and biological engineer.

Korley serves as co-director of the University of Delaware Future Faculty Workshop. She also co-directs the University of Delaware Center for Hybrid, Active, and Responsive Materials which aims to guide fundamental materials research. In 2021, Korley began collaborating with Thomas Epps III to innovate catalytic methods to upcycle plastics into added-value high-performance materials.

In January 2023 Korley was selected as and began service as U.S. Science Envoy. "Korley is among seven distinguished scientists who will begin service as U.S. Science Envoys in January 2023. Like their 23 predecessors, these esteemed scientists are approved by the Secretary of State and will engage internationally at the citizen and government levels to enhance relationships between other nations and the United States, develop partnerships and improve collaboration."

== Awards ==
- 2023 Fellow of the American Chemical Society
- 2022 Fellow of the American Physical Society
- 2020 New Castle County Chamber of Commerce
- 2020 American Institute for Medical and Biological Engineering (AIMBE) Fellow
- 2019 NOBCChE Lloyd N. Ferguson Young Scientist Award
- 2011 DuPont Young Professor

== Selected publications ==
- Van de Voorde, K.; Pokorski, J. P.; and Korley, L.T.J.; "Exploring Morphological Effects on the Mechanics of Blended PLA/PCL Extruded Fibers Fabricated using Multilayer Coextrusion," Macromolecules 2020, doi:10.1021/acs.macromol.0c00289
- M. Chen et al., "Living Additive Manufacturing: Transformation of Parent Gels into Diversely Functionalized Daughter Gels Made Possible by Visible Light Photoredox Catalysis," ACS Cent. Sci., vol. 3, no. 2, pp. 124–134, Jan. 2017, doi: 10.1021/acscentsci.6b00335.
- R. S. Waletzko, L. T. J. Korley, B. D. Pate, E. L. Thomas, and P. T. Hammond, "Role of Increased Crystallinity in Deformation-Induced Structure of Segmented Thermoplastic Polyurethane Elastomers with PEO and PEO−PPO−PEO Soft Segments and HDI Hard Segments," Macromolecules, vol. 42, no. 6, pp. 2041–2053, Mar. 2009, doi: 10.1021/ma8022052
- L. T. J. Korley, B. D. Pate, E. L. Thomas, and P. T. Hammond, "Effect of the degree of soft and hard segment ordering on the morphology and mechanical behavior of semicrystalline segmented polyurethanes," Polymer, vol. 47, no. 9, pp. 3073–3082, Apr. 2006, doi: 10.1016/j.polymer.2006.02.093.
