= Benjamin Hsiao =

American materials scientist (born 1958)

Benjamin S. Hsiao
- Born: August 12, 1958 (age 68); Taipei, Taiwan
- Education: National Taiwan University (BS); University of Connecticut (PhD)
- Scientific career
- Fields: Polymer chemistry, chemical engineering, materials science
- Workplaces: University of Massachusetts; DuPont Company; University of Delaware; Stony Brook University; Brookhaven National Laboratory
- Thesis: High pressure mesomorphism in polymers (1987)
- Doctoral advisor: E. T. Samulski (chemistry); M. T. Shaw (chemical engineering)
- Other academic advisors: R. S. Stein (chemistry); Horst Henning Winter (chemical engineering)

Benjamin S. Hsiao (born 12 August 1958) is a Taiwanese-American materials scientist. He served as the vice-president for research and chief research officer at Stony Brook University from May 2012 to December 2013.

== Early life and education ==
Hsiao was born in Taipei, Taiwan, and attended the all-boys Taipei Municipal Chien Kuo High School. He graduated from National Taiwan University with a Bachelor of Science in chemical engineering in 1980. He then earned his Ph.D. in polymer science from the University of Connecticut in 1987.

== Academic career ==
He went on to work at the University of Massachusetts between 1987 and 1989 as a postdoctoral research fellow in the department of polymer science and engineering under the tutelage of Richard S. Stein and H. Henning Winter. Immediately afterwards, he was sought by the DuPont Company to work in the Pioneering Laboratory. He stayed with DuPont for 8 years in Wilmington, Delaware until 1997 as a senior staff scientist in the Central Research and Development Department, after which he embarked upon an academic career at Stony Brook University.

Joining Stony Brook University as an assistant professor in 1997, Hsiao was promoted to full professor in 2002 and appointed to the chair of the chemistry department in 2007. It was under his leadership, that the chemistry department at Stony Brook was identified as one of the top departments in the nation, and designated a National Historic Landmark for the invention of Magnetic Resonance Imaging (MRI) by the American Chemical Society.

Hsiao was the vice president for research at Stony Brook University between 2012 and 2013 for 1.5 years. In this position, he was responsible for the campus-wide advancement of Stony Brook's research mission through strategic planning and oversaw the Research Foundation, supervised all university research administration activities and functions, and was the primary advocate for the university's research enterprise on a state, national and international level. His major contributions to the Stony Brook Research Office (SBRO) were in two areas: (1) greater efficiency and transparency of the research administration activities on campus, and (2) new research initiatives to advance Stony Brook's research mission on a state, national and international level.

Since 2008, he has also served as the Chang-Jiang Professor at Donghua University in Shanghai, and a guest professor at the Beijing University of Chemical Technology, Tongji University and the Changchun Institute of Applied Chemistry of the Chinese Academy of Sciences.

== Research ==
Hsiao's laboratory at Stony Brook University aims to understand the structural, morphological development and manipulation of complex polymer systems during preparation and processing in real time at both molecular and nanoscopic scales.

His research in polymer science and engineering has led to novel water purification techniques, Together with his colleague Benjamin Chu, Hsiao has used combined electrospinning and cellulose nanofibrous membranes technologies to produce an hierarchical non-woven pattern of different size fibers (from micrometers to nanometers) to filter water. Along with its mechanical integrity and its interconnected pores and thus high pore density, these filters have high volumetric flow rates without compromised resistance to fouling. Since such filters can have several times better water flux, they are energy efficient and have a broad range of applications ranging from desalination to energy generation.

Such nanofibrous formats are also useful for tissue engineering and drug delivery. As biodegradation rates and drug release rates in medical treatments are functions of fiber, porosity, morphology and chemical compositions, Hsiao and Chu have developed many useful new solutions for biomedical applications, such as nanofibrous scaffolds for tissue engineering and heart tissue constructs, and methods to prevent post-surgery induced abdominal adhesions.

As a material scientist, Hsiao has focused on understanding the fundamental processes involved in the crystallization of polymers. In order to investigate polymer structures, morphology and dynamics from atomic (1-20 Å) to microscopic scales (20 - 1000 Å) in real time, Hsiao's laboratory has come up with simultaneous small-angle X-ray scattering (SAXS) and wide-angle X-ray diffraction (WAXD) techniques. By nature, SAXS probes relatively large-scale structures, in contrast to WAXD that deals mainly with the atomic structure of crystals. SAXS includes not only the diffraction of large lattice spacing, of the order of tens, hundreds or even thousands of interatomic distances, but also the scattering by perturbed or non-periodic structures of amorphous and semi-crystalline materials. Dedicated to polymer research, the Advanced Polymers Participating Research Team (AP-PRT) was formed in 1997 by Hsiao and his colleague Ben Chu to develop a synchrotron X-ray scattering beamline (X27C) at the National Synchrotron Light Source, Brookhaven National Laboratory.

Having published more than 403 peer-reviewed scientific papers, 41 reviews and chapters in books and encyclopedias, 226 conference proceedings, more than 32 issued patents (including 18 US patents) and 18 pending applications, and edited two books, Hsiao holds an h-index of 74 with an ISI Web of Knowledge total citation number exceeding 17,000. He has given more than 244 invited lectures in universities, governmental and industrial research institutes and more than 474 presentations in national and international scientific meetings.

== Selected honors and awards ==
- University of Connecticut Doctoral Fellowship, 1985
- DuPont Young Professor Award, 1998–2001
- SPE/ANTEC Best Technical Papers, 1994 (two), 2002 (one)
- Overseas Visiting Scholarship, National Science Council (Taiwan), 2002, 2006
- Fellow, American Physical Society, 2002
- Fellow, American Chemical Society, 2011
- Fellow, American Association for the Advancement of Science (AAAS), 2011, citation reads “for his distinguished contributions to the fields of polymer sciences and water purification, as well as to chemical research and education at Stony Brook University.”
- Licensed Innovation Award, Research Foundation of State University of New York, 2005
- Special Creativity Award, Division of Materials Research, National Science Foundation, 2007
- Chang-Jiang Professor Scholarship (in Donghua University, Shanghai), Education Ministry of China, 2008
- Charter Fellow, National Academy of Inventors, 2013
- Cooperative Research Award in Polymer Science and Engineering (with Andy H. Tsou), Polymeric Materials: Science and Engineering Division of the American Chemical Society, 2015

== Synergistic activities ==
- Sigma Xi, 1985
- Phi Kappa Phi, 1985
- Member of Editorial Board for Membranes, since 2011
- Member of Editorial Advisory Board for Macromolecules 2010–2012
- Member of Editorial Advisory Board for ACS Macro Letters, since 2012
- Member of Editorial Advisory Board for Polymer, since 2003
- Member of Editorial Advisory Board for J. Macromol. Sci. – Phys., since 1995
- Member of Editorial Advisory Board for J. Polymer Research, since 1996
- Member of Executive Editorial Board for High Performance Polymers, since 1996
- Member of Editorial Advisory Board for Chinese Journal Applied Chemistry (Yingyong Huaxue), since 2001
- Member, Advisory Board, American Chemical Society, Petroleum Research Fund, 2007–2012
- Member, Science and Technology Steering Committee (STSC), BSA Board of Directors, Brookhaven National Laboratory (BNL), 2010-2012

== Professional societies ==
- Society of Plastics Engineers (1983–1997, 2002–2005)
- The North American Thermal Analysis Society (1985–1997)
- American Institute of Chemical Engineers (1989–1997, 2007-)
- American Chemical Society, Polymer Chemistry Divisions (since 1984), Polymer Materials Science and Engineering Division (since 1989), Rubber Division (2003–2006)
- American Crystallographic Association (since 1991)
- American Physical Society, High Polymer Physics Division (since 1985)
- American Association for the Advancement of Science (since 1990)
- Materials Research Society (since 1989)
