= Theresa M. Reineke =

American chemist

Theresa Marie Reineke
- Born: January 1, 1972 (age 54)
- Education: University of Wisconsin–Eau Claire; Arizona State University; University of Michigan
- Scientific career
- Workplaces: University of Minnesota; California Institute of Technology
- Thesis: Metal-organic porous frameworks designed from zinc(II), terbium(III), europium(III), and organic carboxylate building blocks (2000)
- Doctoral advisor: Omar M. Yaghi

Theresa M. Reineke (born January 1, 1972) is an American chemist and Distinguished McKnight University Professor at the University of Minnesota. She designs sustainable, environmentally friendly polymer-based delivery systems for targeted therapeutics. She is the associate editor of ACS Macro Letters.

== Early life and education ==
Reineke earned her bachelor's degree at University of Wisconsin–Eau Claire. She moved to Arizona State University for her graduate studies and earned a master's degree in 1998. Reineke was a PhD student at the University of Michigan, where she was supervised by Michael O'Keeffe and Omar M. Yaghi. She was awarded the Wirt and Mary Cornell Prize for Outstanding Graduate Research. Reineke joined the California Institute of Technology as an National Institutes of Health postdoctoral fellow in 2000.

== Research and career ==
Reineke joined the University of Minnesota in 2011. Her research group focus on the design, characterisation and functionalisation of macromolecular systems. These macromolecules include biocompatible polymers that can deliver DNA for regenerative medicine as well as targeted therapeutic treatments. She was made a Lloyd H. Reyerson Professor with tenure at the University of Minnesota in 2011. Reineke has published over 140 papers.

Nucleic acids can have an unparalleled specificity for targets inside a cell, but need to be compacted into nanostructures (polyplexes) that can enter cells. Reineke designs polymer-based transportation systems for nucleic acids. These polymer vehicles can improve the solubility and bioavailability of drugs. These often incorporate carbohydrates, which have an affinity for polyplexes and are non-toxic. She is a member of the University of Minnesota Centre for Sustainable Polymers, synthesising polymers from sustainable ingredients. The carbohydrate units within her polymer drug delivery systems are a widely available, renewable resource. The sustainable polymers designed by Reineke include poly(ester-thioethers).

Reineke used reversible addition−fragmentation chain-transfer polymerization for the synthesis of diblock terpolymers that can be used for targeted drug delivery. She used spray dried dispersions of the polymer with the drug probucol.

Reineke was made a University of Minnesota Distinguished McKnight University Professor in 2017. She is the associate editor of ACS Macro Letters and on the Advisory Board of Biomacromolecules, Bioconjugate Chemistry and Polymer Chemistry. She is a member of the American Chemical Society Polymer Division. Her work has been supported by an National Science Foundation CAREER Award, a Sloan Research Fellowship, the National Institutes of Health and the National Academy of Sciences.

== Awards and honors ==
- 2000 Outstanding Graduate Research Award from the Wirt and Mary Cornell Prize
- 2003 American Chemical Society (PMSE Division), Arthur K. Doolittle Award
- 2007 YWCA Rising Star
- 2007 OH Bioscience Thirty in Their 30s Award
- 2012 American Society of Gene and Cell Therapy Outstanding New Investigator Award
- 2012 American Chemical Society, Polymer Materials: Science and Engineering Division Macro 2012 Lecture Award
- 2016 American Institute for Medical and Biological Engineering Fellow
- 2016 University of Minnesota Sara Evans Faculty Woman Scholar/Leader Award
- 2016 University of Minnesota George W. Taylor Award for Distinguished Research
- 2017 American Chemical Society Polymer Chemistry Division Carl S. Marvel Creative Polymer Chemistry Award
- 2018 Danisco Foundation DuPont Nutrition and Health Science Excellence Medal
- 2018 American Chemical Society POLY Fellow Award
- 2018 Big 10 Alliance Academic Leadership Program Fellow

== Patents ==
- 2014 Monomers, polymers and articles containing the same from sugar derived compounds
- 2018 Isosorbide-based polymethacrylates
