= Miriam Rafailovich =

American materials engineer

- Born: October 29, 1953 (age 72)
- Education: Brooklyn College (BS, 1974); Stony Brook University (PhD, 1980)
- Known for: Nanomaterials engineering
- Spouse: Jonathan C. Sokolov
- Awards: 1987: Ruth E Recu Chair, Weizmann Institute of Science; 1997: Fellow, Division of High Polymer Physics; 1997: Outstanding Stony Brook Scientist
- Scientific career
- Fields: Materials engineering
- Workplaces: Stony Brook University
- Patrons: National Science Foundation MRSEC
- Website: www.stonybrook.edu/commcms/garcia/

Miriam Rafailovich (born October 29, 1953) is an American materials engineering researcher. She is the director of the Garcia Materials Research Science and Engineering Center at Stony Brook University as well as former co-director of the Chemical and Molecular Engineering program at Stony Brook University. Her publications focus mainly on nanoscale materials engineering, including nanofibers, supercritical carbon dioxide, and biodegradable polymers.

== Early life and education ==
Miriam Rafailovich received a Bachelor of Science degree from Brooklyn College in 1974 and a Ph.D in nuclear physics from SUNY Stony Brook in 1980. She speaks English, Romanian, Hebrew, Yiddish, French, and German.

== Personal life ==
Rafailovich is married to Jonathan C. Sokolov, who is also a polymer engineering researcher.

== Published works ==
Rafailovich has had over 140 papers published between 1975 and 2001.

She has co-edited the following publications:

- Women in Chemistry and Physics (Eds. Louise S. Grinstein, Miriam H. Rafailovich, Rose K. Rose; Greenwood Press, 1993)
- Polymer International Volume 49, Issue 5, 2000 Eds. M.H. Rafailovich, S.A. Schwarz
- High Performance Polymers 2001, Eds. B. Hsaio, M.H. Rafailovich

Patents:

- "Patterning Method to Produce Nanoscale Magnetic Structures Using Polymer Self Assembly": We demonstrate that it is possible to produce a magnetic nanopattern on a substrate by using a self assembled co-polymer film as a mask. The scale of the pattern can be selected to range from several nanometers to micrometres. The pattern can be produced on any arbitrary magnetic film or interface and hence the method is applicable to metal multi-layers produced using ultra high vacuum or MBE. The use of this method to produce a working Giant Magneto Resistance device is demonstrated. Developers: Richard J. Gambino, Miriam Rafailovich, Jonathan Sokolov, Shaoming Zhu (1997).
- "A Compatibilizer for Immiscible Polymer Blends" Developers: Miriam Rafailovich, Jonathan Sokolov, Benjamin Chu, Benjamin Hsiao A procedure was developed for the universal compatibilization of polymer blend thin films using surface functional zed exfoliated clays. The clays are non specific and compatiblization of general multi -component systems is possible (2000).

== Awards and honors ==
- 1987: Ruth E Recu Chair, Weizmann Institute of Science
- 1997: Fellow, Division of High Polymer Physics
- 1997: Outstanding Stony Brook Scientist
