= Moon J. Park =

Korean chemical engineer

Moon Jeong Park
- 박문정
- Born: 1977 (age 48–49)
- Citizenship: South Korean
- Education: Seoul National University
- Scientific career
- Workplaces: Pohang University of Science and Technology
- Website: http://parkgroup.postech.ac.kr/prof-park/

Moon Jeong Park (박문정) is a Korean chemical engineer who is a Professor of Chemistry at Pohang University of Science and Technology. She is interested in polymers for energy storage and transport. She studies the transport in charge-containing polymeric materials. She is the second non-American recipient to be awarded the American Physical Society John D. Dillion Medal and the 2016 Hanwha Total IUPAC Young Scientist Award.

== Early Career and education ==
Park was born in 1977 in South Korea. Park completed her Ph.D. the Seoul National University in 2006. She was advised by Kookheon Char. In 2009, she was a postdoctoral research fellow with Nitash P. Balsara at University of California, Berkeley.

== Research and career ==
Park joined as assistant professor to the department of chemistry at Pohang University of Science and Technology in 2009. She was promoted to associate professor in 2013. Her research interests includes understanding the thermodynamics and transport in charge-containing polymeric materials. Park specifically focuses on developing polymeric materials that are more efficient, predictable, and sustainable for energy storage and transport. She has developed a lithium sulfur battery technology to increased charging speeds and have longer battery life. Her main contributions have been in ionic-liquid containing polymers, design of self-assembled polymer electrolytes, organic-organics nano-hybrids for enhanced ion/charge transport, and chemical sensors based on ionic polymers. She also works on electric responsive actuators to create artificial muscles.

Park is an associate editor of Macromolecules. She also on the editorial board of Journal of Polymer Science: Polymer Physics and Journal of Applied Polymer Science.

== Awards and honors ==
- 2025: POSCO TJ Park Prize, POSCO TJ Park Foundation
- 2024: Scientist of the Month, Ministry of Science and ICT and National Research Foundation of Korea
- 2021: Fellow of the American Physical Society, "for creative and insightful experiments to elucidate the roles of molecular architecture and self-assembled nanostructure on the electrical, ion transport, and mechanical properties of charged polymers"
- 2017: American Physical Society John H. Dillion Medal
- 2016: 20th Young Scientist Award, Ministry of Science and Technology (South Korea). ICT and Future Planning of Korea
- 2016: Hanwha Total-IUPAC Young Polymer Scientist Award
- 2015: Woman Scientist/Engineer of the Year Award
- 2011: Asia Excellence Award Young Scientists, Society of Polymer Science Japan
- 2011: Chong-Am Science Fellowship, POSCO (formerly Pohang Iron and Steel Company), TJ Park Foundation
- 2004: Best Paper Award, IUPAC World Polymer Congress
