= Lutkenhaus =

Lutkenhaus or Lütkenhaus is a surname of German origin. Notable people with the surname include:

- Almuth Lütkenhaus (1930–1996), sculptor
- Cooper Lutkenhaus (born 2008), American middle-distance runner
- Jodie Lutkenhaus, American chemical engineer
- Joe Lutkenhaus (born 1947), professor at the University of Kansas Medical Center
