= Thomas H. Epps III =

American chemist

Thomas H. Epps, III
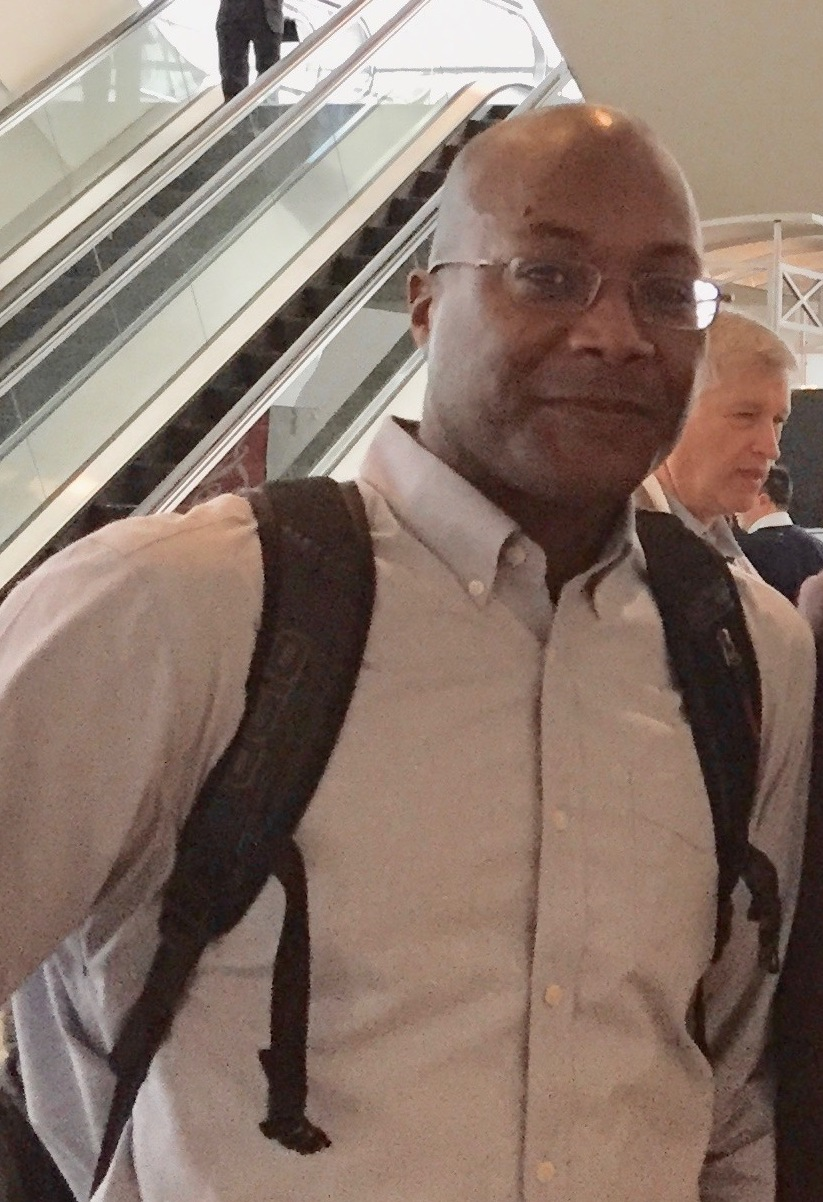
- at the 2016 APS March Meeting
- Education: Massachusetts Institute of Technology (BS, MS); University of Minnesota (PhD)
- Known for: Polymer chemistry, polymer physics, polymer science
- Awards: Fellow of the National Academy of Inventors (2021)
- Scientific career
- Workplaces: University of Delaware
- Thesis: Locating network phases in linear ABC triblock copolymers (2004)
- Doctoral advisor: Frank S. Bates

Thomas H. Epps, III is an American chemist and the Thomas & Kipp Gutshall Professor of Chemical & Biomolecular Engineering at the University of Delaware. He has a joint appointment in Materials Science & Engineering, and an affiliated appointment in Biomedical Engineering. He serves as the director of the Center for Research in Soft Matter & Polymers, the director of the Center for Hybrid, Active, and Responsive Materials (a National Science Foundation, Materials Research Science and Engineering Center), and the co-director of the Center for Plastics Innovations (A Department of Energy, Energy Frontiers Research Center). His research considers the design, synthesis, characterization, and application of nanostructure-containing polymers related to biobased materials, drug delivery, alternative energy (batteries), nanotemplating, and composite-based personal-protective equipment. He is also the co-founder of Lignolix, which is focused on the valorization of biomass waste.

== Early life and education ==
Epps was born to Ruth Epps, a professor of accounting at Virginia Union University and Virginia Commonwealth University, and Thomas H. Epps, Jr, professor of chemistry at Virginia State University. He grew up in Chesterfield County, Virginia. Epps completed his undergraduate degree at the Massachusetts Institute of Technology. He was one of the first people to be selected as an American Chemical Society Minority Scholar. He remained there for his graduate studies, completing a master's degree in chemical engineering (Practice School) in 1999 before moving to the University of Minnesota for his doctorate. At the University of Minnesota he worked under the supervision of Frank S. Bates. After completing his PhD research, Epps joined the National Institute of Standards and Technology as a National Research Council Fellow in the Polymers Division.

== Research and career ==
In the summer of 2006 Epps joined the University of Delaware. Here his research considers nanostructured assemblies of polymers for a variety of applications. In particular, he has focused on block copolymers; polymers which are composed of two or more chemically dissimilar units. Specifically, Epps develops block copolymers that can assemble into nano-scale structures with carefully controlled molecular shapes, sizes and orientations.

By manipulating the regions between blocks to control phase transitions and intermolecular packing, Epps has studied the interfacial interactions of tapered block copolymers. He also pioneered the development of gradient substrates and free surfaces the deposition of block copolymer thin films. Epps showed that self-assembled monolayers of chlorosilane used in combination with flow-coating and solvent vapour gradients can result in nanostructures with precise optical and electronic properties. Epps spent 2013 as a Martin Luther King Jr. Fellow at Massachusetts Institute of Technology, where he worked with Timothy M. Swager on the self-assembly of polymers.

In 2016 he demonstrated it was possible to synthesize novel polymers with tuneable thermal properties through the use of waste from the pulp and paper business. He was awarded a $4 million grant from the National Science Foundation to develop new synthesis pathways that allow the development of novel materials from lignin. When talking about the new programme, Epps said "one of the big problems that we want to address is sustainability ... not just thinking about whether we can make new polymers or catalysts from biomass, but understanding the impact of these polymers on the environment, in terms of toxicity and in terms of the resources,". He went on to found Lignolix, a spin-out company that focuses on making sustainable materials from renewable biomass. Lignolix won the 2019 University of Delaware FastPass competition.

Epps has realised polymer-based for lithium-ion batteries, where the polymer serves the role of the liquid electrolyte. The polymer prevents calcification of the positive and negative electrodes in the battery, which can otherwise cause sparks and fires. Polymers also permit quick charging/discharging due to the formation of small channels that allow fast ion transport.

In 2020 Epps and LaShanda Korley were announced as the directors of the United States Department of Energy Center for Plastics Innovation. The $11.65 million center brings together researchers from the University of Delaware, University of Chicago, University of Massachusetts Amherst and Oak Ridge National Laboratory to upcycle plastic waste. Also in 2020, Epps was announced as the director of the University of Delaware's Center for Hybrid, Active, and Responsive Materials (UD CHARM), a National Science Foundation Materials Research Science and Engineering Center. The $6.5 million center brings together researchers from University of Delaware, University of Pennsylvania and the National Institute of Standards & Technology.

== Awards and honours ==
- 2021 National Academy of Inventors Fellow
- 2021 American Institute for Medical and Biological Engineering Fellow
- 2020 National Organization for the Professional Advancement of Black Chemists and Chemical Engineers Percy L. Julian Award
- 2020 American Chemical Society Prominent African American Chemists
- 2018 Elected fellow of the Royal Society of Chemistry
- 2017 Elected fellow of the American Physical Society
- 2016 American Physical Society John H. Dillon Medal
- 2015 American Institute of Chemical Engineers Owens Corning Young Investigator Award
- 2014 Kavli Foundation Fellow of the National Academies of Sciences, Engineering, and Medicine
- 2014 Sigma Xi Young Investigator Award
- 2012 Massachusetts Institute of Technology Martin Luther King Jr. Visiting Professor
- 2010 DuPont Professor Award
- 2009 Presidential Early Career Award for Scientists and Engineers

== Select publications ==
- Albert, Julie N. L.; Epps, Thomas H. (2010-06-01). "Self-assembly of block copolymer thin films". Materials Today. 13 (6): 24–33. doi:10.1016/S1369-7021(10)70106-1. ISSN 1369-7021.
- Young, Wen-Shiue; Kuan, Wei-Fan; Epps, Thomas H. (2014-01-01). "Block copolymer electrolytes for rechargeable lithium batteries". Journal of Polymer Science Part B: Polymer Physics. 52 (1): 1–16. Bibcode:2014JPoSB..52....1Y. doi:10.1002/polb.23404.
- Theato, Patrick; Sumerlin, Brent S.; O'Reilly, Rachel K.; Epps, III, Thomas H. (2013). "Stimuli responsive materials". Chemical Society Reviews. 42 (17): 7055–7056. doi:10.1039/c3cs90057f. ISSN 0306-0012. PMID 23881304.
