= Chinedum Osuji =

Professor of Chemical and Biomolecular Engineering at University of Pennsylvania

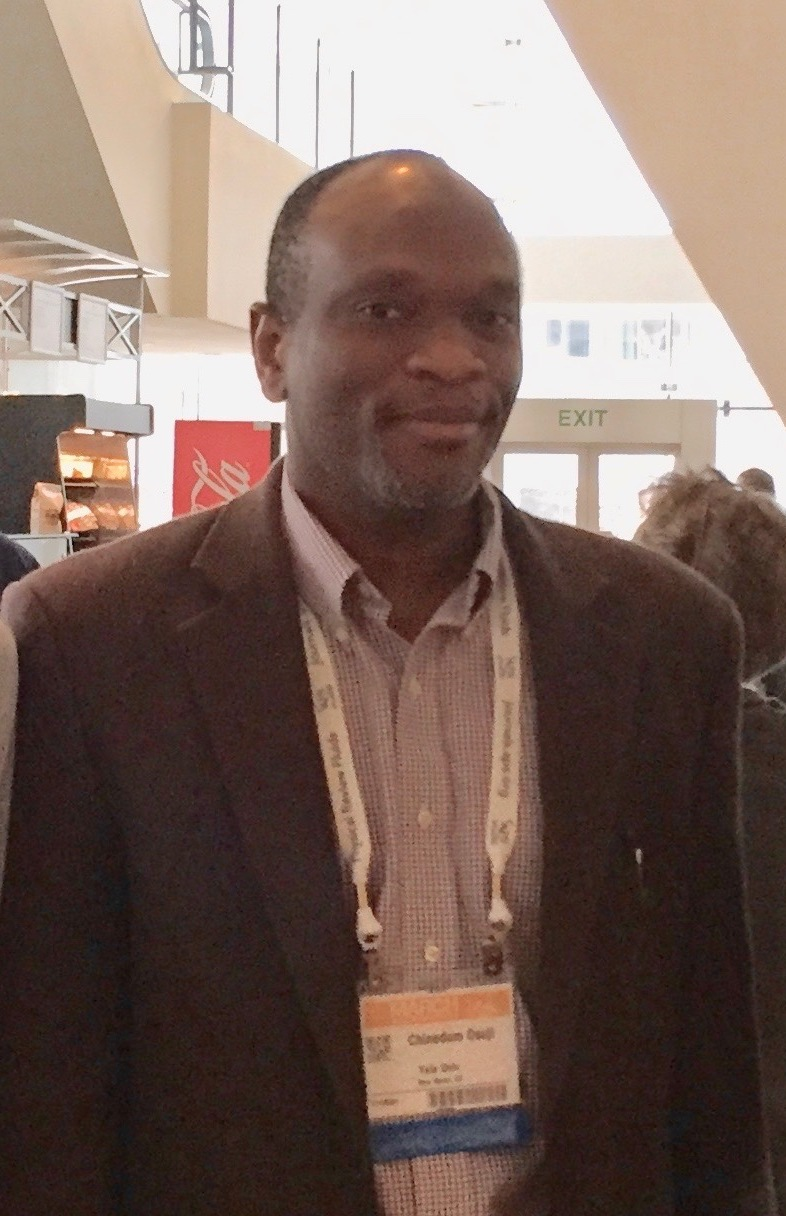

Personal information
- Nationality: Trinidad and Tobago
- Born: 15 December 1976 (age 49)
- Height: 1.80 m (5 ft 11 in)
- Weight: 80 kg (176 lb)

Sport
- Sport: Taekwondo
- Event: 80 kg
Medal record
Men's taekwondo
Representing Trinidad and Tobago
Pan American Games
Bronze medal – third place	2007 Rio de Janeiro	80 kg

Chinedum Osuji (born December 15, 1976) is the Eduardo D. Glandt Presidential Professor and the departmental chair of chemical and biomolecular engineering (CBE) at University of Pennsylvania. He is also a former Taekwondo Olympian and represented Trinidad and Tobago. His laboratory works on polymers and soft materials for functional application including liquid filtration. He is the associate editor of the journal Macromolecules.

== Early life and education ==
Chinedum Osuji was born in Trinidad and Tobago and lived there until he began his education in the United States. He studied materials science and engineering, receiving his bachelor's degree from Cornell University in 1999. During his studies Cornell he completed a senior thesis on random copolymers for polymer interface reinforcement with Edward J. Kramer. In 2003, Osuji received his PhD at the Massachusetts Institute of Technology (MIT). At MIT he worked under the supervision of Edwin L. Thomas. His research thesis was on the structure and properties of liquid crystalline block copolymers.

After receiving his PhD, he worked at Surface Logix Inc., a start-up company, working on using soft lithography to fabricate cell-based assays, planar waveguides and other devices. From 2005 to 2007, Osuji was a postdoctoral researcher at Harvard University working with David A. Weitz on colloidal gels.

== Taekwondo career ==
In 2000, while at MIT, Chinedum Osuji co-founded the MIT sport taekwondo team.

He represented Trinidad and Tobago at the World Taekwondo Championships in the 2001, 2003, and 2005 games.

In 2003, he received a silver medal at the Pan American Games qualifier.

In 2004, Chinedum qualified to compete in taekwondo men's 80 kg at the 2004 Summer Olympics in Athens, but was defeated by Rashad Ahmadov of Azerbaijan in the preliminary round.

He competed in the 2007 Pan American Games, receiving a bronze medal and then announced his retirement from future international competitions.

== Scientific career and research ==
In 2007, after completing his post-doc at Harvard University, he joined the faculty of Yale University in the department of chemical and environmental engineering. In 2017 he joined the department of chemical and biomolecular engineering of the University of Pennsylvania as the Eduardo D. Glandt Presidential Professor. In 2021, he became the chair of the department of chemical and biomolecular engineering.

Osuji research focuses on the study of the structure, dynamics, and self-assembly of soft matter for use in applications such as organic solar cells, nanofiltration and microfluidic bio-assays. In particular, he has studied methods to induce long-range order in soft matter systems such as block copolymers and liquid crystals and self-assembly of nanomaterials.

He is the author of over 100 publications. Osuji is currently an associate editor of Macromolecules.

== Honors and awards ==
- 2008 National Science Foundation CAREER Award
- 2010 Yale College Arthur Greer Memorial Prize
- 2011 University of California, Santa Barbara Materials Research Lab Dow Distinguished Lectureship
- 2012 3M Nontenured Faculty Award
- 2012 Office of Naval Research Young Investigator Award
- 2013 University of California, Santa Barbara Materials Department Lange Lectureship
- 2015 National Academy of Engineering von Humboldt Frontiers of Engineering Speaker
- 2015 American Physical Society John H. Dillon Medal
- 2015 Rensselaer Polytechnic Institute Hendrick C. Van Ness Award
- 2016 Yale School of Engineering and Applied Science Advancement of Basic and Applied Science Award
- 2016 Yale Graduate School of Arts and Sciences Graduate Mentor Award
- 2018 University of Illinois, Urbana-Champaign Racheff Lecture
- 2018 American Physical Society Fellow
- 2019 Nano Research Young Investigator Award
- 2021 Intel Outstanding Researcher Award
