= Rubner =

Rubner may refer to:

- Ben Rubner (1921 – 1998), British trade unionist
- Max Rubner (1854 – 1932), German physiologist and hygienist
- Michael Rubner, American engineer
- Rubner Peak, the highest point on the sharp ridge separating McCance and Widdowson Glaciers in Antarctica
