= Stuart Rowan =

Scottish researcher

Stuart Rowan FRS
- Born: 1969 (age 56–57); Edinburgh, Scotland

Academic background
- Education: University of Glasgow (BSc, PhD)
- Doctoral advisor: David D. MacNicol

Academic work
- Discipline: Chemistry
- Institutions: University of Cambridge; University of California, Los Angeles; Case Western Reserve University; University of Chicago; Argonne National Laboratory

Stuart J. Rowan FRS (born 1969) is a Scottish chemist.

== Early life and education ==
Rowan was born in Edinburgh on October 16, 1969, and raised in Troon, South Ayrshire. He completed a Bachelor of Science in chemistry at the University of Glasgow.

Rowan earned his doctorate from the Chemistry Department at the University of Glasgow under the direction of David D. MacNicol in 1994 working on Supramolecular Crystal Engineering. (Thesis)

In late 1994, he began postdoctoral working for Jeremy Sanders in the Chemistry Department at the University of Cambridge working on dynamic covalent libraries.

== Career ==
In 1998, Rowan left the United Kingdom to continue his postdoctoral studies with Nobel Laureate Sir J. Fraser Stoddart at the University of California, Los Angeles, where he worked on using dynamic covalent chemistry in the synthesis of interlocked molecules. He also developed Surrogate phosphonium stoppers for rotaxanes that could be exchanged using Wittig chemistry.

In 1999, he was appointed as an assistant professor in the Department of Macromolecular Science and Engineering at Case Western Reserve University in Cleveland, Ohio. In 2005, he was promoted to Associate Professor with tenure and became a Full Professor in 2008. In 2009, he was named the Kent Hale Smith Professor of Engineering. There he starting working supramolecular materials using nucleobases and pi-pi interactions, metallosupramolecular polymers and mechanically adaptive cellulose nanocrystal composites (with Christoph Weder). During his time at CWRU he was awarded the NSF CAREER Award, the Morley Medal from the Cleveland Section of the American Chemical Society in 2014 and the Herman Mark Scholar Award from the American Chemical Society in 2015.

In 2016, Rowan joined The University of Chicago's Pritzker School of Molecular Engineering as well as that university's Department of Chemistry, and accepted an appointment as the Barry L. MacLean Professor for Molecular Engineering Innovation and Enterprise in 2018. Rowan also holds a staff scientist position at the Argonne National Laboratory.

In June 2026, Rowan also was named Director of the Energy Technologies initiative, a partnership between the Institute for Climate and Sustainable Growth and the UChicago Pritzker School of Molecular Engineering (UChicago PME).

At the University of Chicago, his research group have continued to carry out the exploration of dynamic covalent networks using primarily disulfide bonds and room temperature dynamic, catalyst free thia-Michael bonds. His group has pioneered the use of dynamic covalent networks to access pluripotent plastics. With Henrich Jaegar his group has developed dynamic covalent dense suspensions that exhibit time dependent rheopectic behavior.

His group have also developed the first synthetic route to poly[n]catenanes and slide ring polycatenanes prepared biographene from biowaste has programs working on all organic batteries and with Jeff Hubbel has developed stimuli-responsive polymer-based nanoparticles can encapsulate proteins and RNA but simply warming to room temperature.

Rowan's work has been shared on the UChicago Pritzker School of Molecular Engineering https://pme.uchicago.edu website and elsewhere: "Shape-shifting particles let scientists control how fluids flow", "Going green with graphite: Researchers turn plant waste into high-tech material", and "'Pluripotent' plastic: from one starting polymer, many materials." In 2024, his work was written about in the New York Times: "A Shape-Shifting Plastic With a Flexible Future."

Rowan is a Fellow of the Royal Society (FRS), Fellow of the American Chemical Society and Fellow of the Royal Society of Chemistry (FRSC). Rowan is the founding deputy editor of the journal ACS Macro Letters, and succeeded Timothy P. Lodge as editor in chief in 2018.
