= Paula T. Hammond =

American chemical engineer (born 1963)

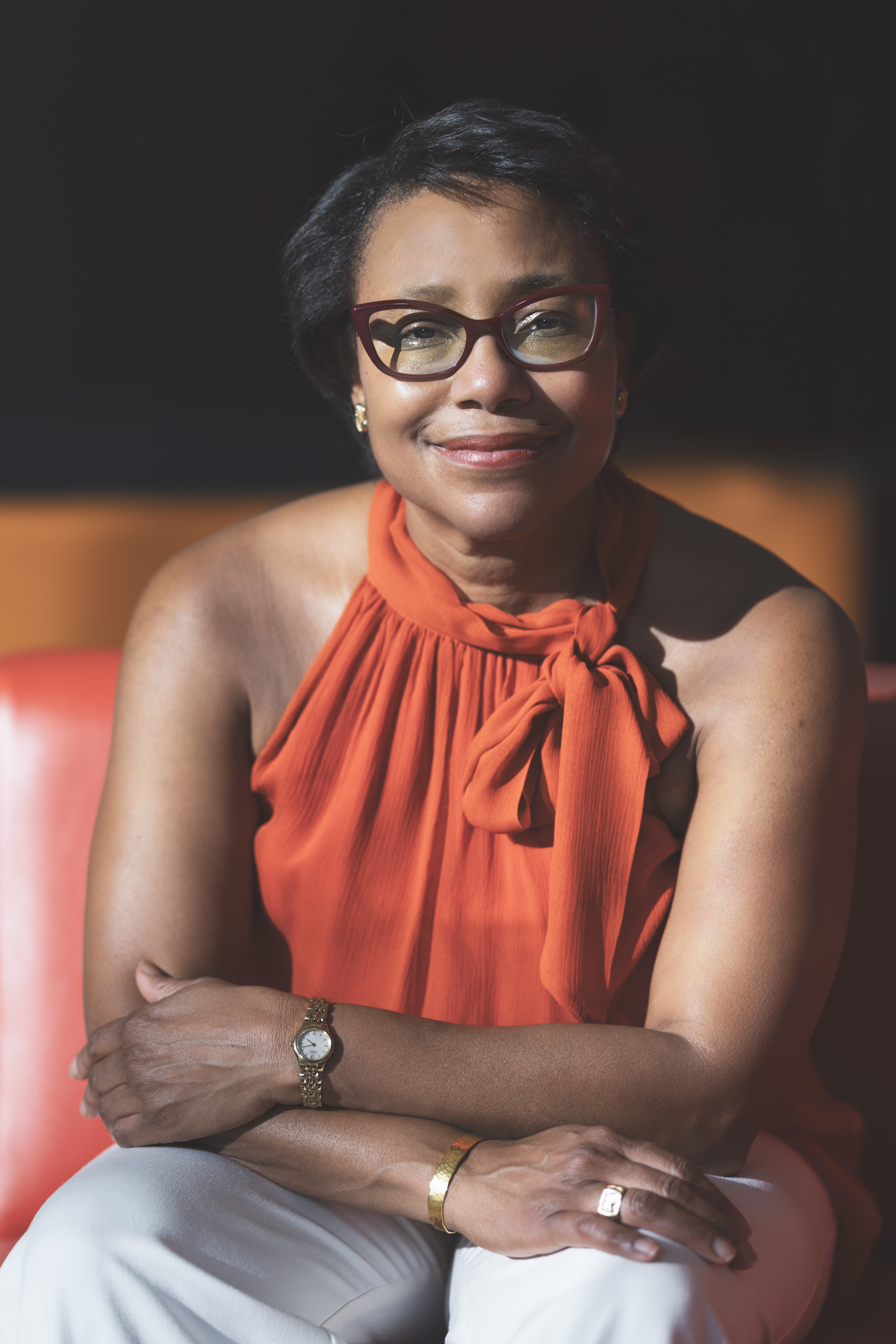
- Born: September 3, 1963 (age 63); Detroit, Michigan, United States
- Education: Massachusetts Institute of Technology; Georgia Institute of Technology
- Awards: Fellow of the National Academy of Inventors (2021), Fellow of the National Academy of Sciences (2019), Fellow of the National Academy of Engineering (2017), Fellow of the National Academy of Medicine (2016), Fellow of the American Institute of Chemical Engineers (2016), Fellow of the American Academy of Arts and Sciences (2013)
- Scientific career
- Fields: Biomaterials, Drug Delivery, Cancer immunology
- Workplaces: Massachusetts Institute of Technology
- Thesis: The Synthesis, Characterization and Optical Properties of Novel Diacetylene-Containing Aromatic Liquid Crystalline Polymers (1993)
- Doctoral advisor: Michael Rubner
- Other academic advisors: George M. Whitesides
- Doctoral students: Jodie Lutkenhaus; LaShanda Korley
- Website: https://hammondlab.mit.edu/

Paula Therese Hammond (born September 3, 1963) is an Institute Professor and the Dean of the School of Engineering at the Massachusetts Institute of Technology (MIT). In 2015, she became the first woman and person of color appointed as head of the Chemical Engineering department. Her laboratory designs polymers and nanoparticles for drug delivery and energy-related applications including batteries and fuel cells.

Hammond has been the recipient of numerous awards and is a member of the National Academy of Medicine (2016), the National Academy of Engineering (2017, "for contributions to self-assembly of polyelectrolytes, colloids, and block copolymers at surfaces and interfaces for energy and healthcare applications"), the National Academy of Sciences (2019), and the National Academy of Inventors (2021).

She is an intramural faculty member of the Koch Institute for Integrative Cancer Research and an associate editor of ACS Nano.

== Early life and education ==
External videos
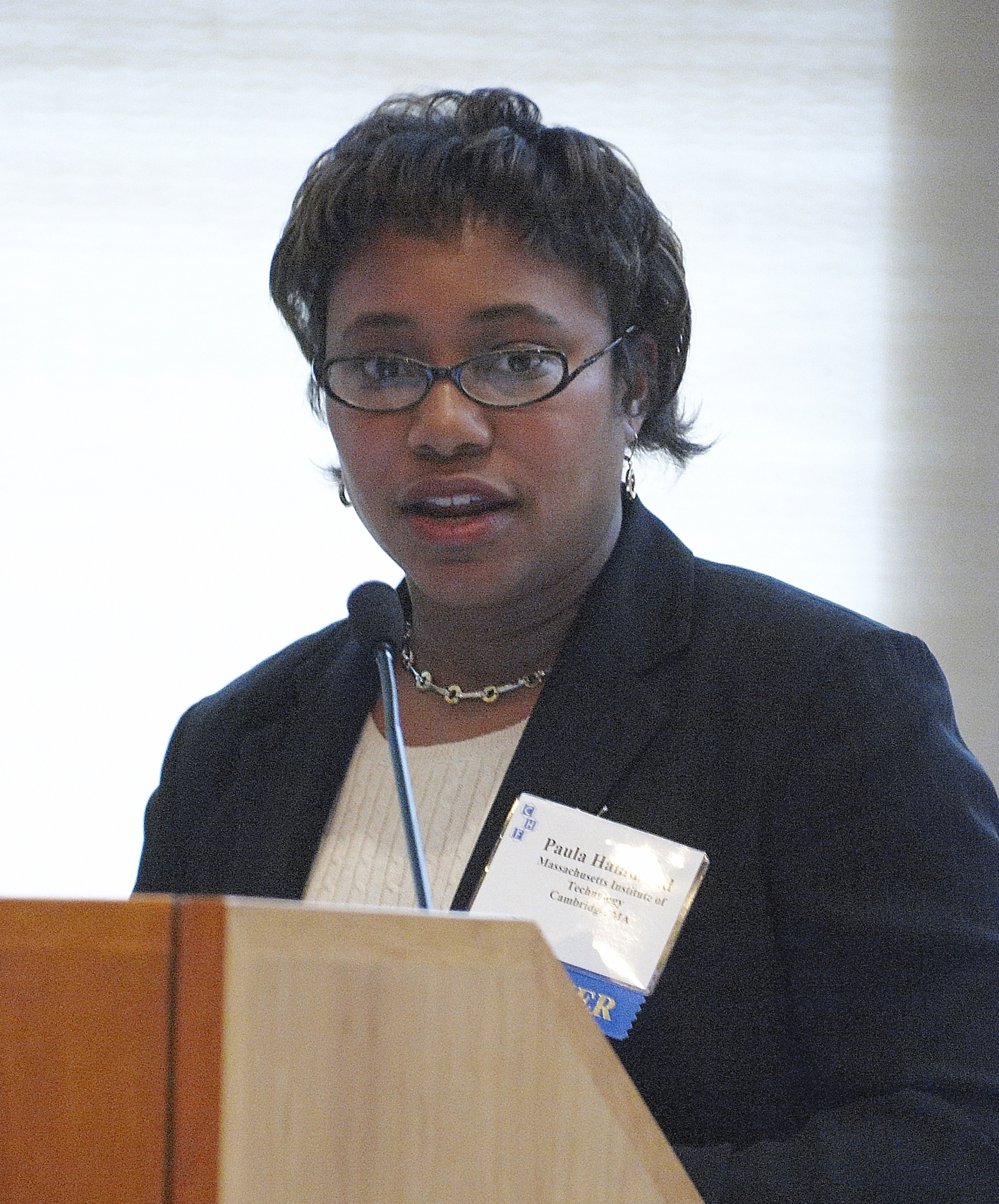
- "I learned to not be intimidated by the problem", Science History Institute

Hammond was born in 1963 in Detroit, Michigan as Paula Therese Goodwin to parents Jesse Francis and Della Mae Goodwin (née McGraw). Her father has a PhD in Biochemistry and her mother has a master's degree in nursing.

Goodwin graduated a year prior to her expected date at the Academy of the Sacred Heart in Bloomfield, Michigan in 1980. After her graduation, Goodwin went on to study and earn a Bachelor of Science in Chemical Engineering from Massachusetts Institute of Technology (MIT) in 1984. She then worked for Motorola for two years as a process engineer, packaging integrated circuits. She returned to academia and obtained a Master of Science in chemical engineering from the Georgia Institute of Technology in 1988, while working at Georgia Tech Research Institute as a research engineer. Hammond's master's thesis was on conducting elastomers for robotic tactile sensors.

In 1988, she returned to MIT to earn a PhD in chemical engineering. At MIT, she worked under the supervision of Michael F. Rubner, where her PhD thesis research focused on synthesizing polymers with mechanochromic properties. After completing her PhD in 1993, Hammond pursued postdoctoral research with George M. Whitesides in the chemistry department at Harvard University via an NSF Postdoctoral Fellowship.

== Research and career ==
In 1995, Hammond was appointed to Massachusetts Institute of Technology as an assistant professor. Hammond's research focuses on understanding how secondary interactions guide material assembly at surfaces and in-solution to design polymers and nanoparticles for applications in drug delivery; wound healing; and energy and fuel cells. Her work involves Layer by layer (LbL) assembly, which generates thin films of alternating positively and negatively charged molecules for biomedical applications. Additionally, her lab uses nanoparticle carriers for targeted drug, gene, and siRNA delivery for cancer treatment as well as artificial polypeptides and polymeric nucleic acids to interact with biology and build novel drug systems.

=== Medical applications ===
Hammond has developed "stealth polymers" to disguise cancer chemotherapeutics in nanoparticles for better entry into tumors. She also develops approaches to transport RNA into cells to selectively increase or decrease the expression of specific genes.

Hammond co-founded MIT's Institute for Soldier Nanotechnologies (ISN), a partnership between MIT, the Army, and industry partners to develop nanotechnology that improves soldier "protection and survivability." Through ISN, Hammond designed a spray that increases the rate of blood clotting to prevent blood loss.

Hammond developed LayerForm™️ technology to build drug delivery films with alternating drug and polymer layers. In 2013, she co-founded a biotechnology company, LayerBio Inc. to commercialize LayerForm™️ for regenerative medicine applications in glaucoma, wound healing, and tendon repair.

Hammond is a member of multiple scientific advisory boards, including Moderna Therapeutics, Inc. and Camden Partners LLC. She is also a member of the board for Alector, a biotech company focusing on immuno-neurology, and Focal Medical and Senda Biosciences. Additionally, Hammond serves on non-profit boards such as MIT Engine and the Burroughs Wellcome Fund.

=== Energy and fuel cells ===
Hammond also works on the development of polymers for use in batteries thin films of carbon microtubules for applications in batteries, solar cells, and fuel cells. She presented research on virus-based batteries to Barack Obama in 2009.

== Honors and recognitions ==
Hammond has received multiple honors and awards throughout her career. As a graduate student in 1992, she was awarded a Ford Foundation Dissertation Fellowship from the National Academy of Sciences. Her postdoc was supported by an NSF postdoctoral fellowship in chemistry, awarded in 1994. Since joining the faculty at MIT, Hammond has amassed several plaudits, with early career highlights including an Environmental Protection Agency Early Career Research Award in 1996 and an NSF CAREER Award for Young Investigators in 1997. In 2013, Hammond was one of three African-American women to be elected to the American Academy of Arts and Sciences. She was elected to the National Academy of Medicine and the National Academy of Engineering in rapid succession in 2016 and 2017, respectively, the National Academy of Sciences in 2019, and finally the National Academy of Inventors in 2021.

In 2021, Hammond was also selected to be a member of the President's Council of Advisors on Science and Technology (PCAST) under President Biden. In 2024, Hammond was awarded the Benjamin Franklin Medal in Chemistry for developing an innovative approach to create novel materials one molecular layer at a time and applying these materials to areas ranging from drug delivery to energy storage. In 2025, Hammond was a recipient of the National Medal of Technology and Innovation.

== Selected bibliography ==
- Nam, K. T.; Kim, DW; Yoo, PJ; Chiang, CY; Meethong, N; Hammond, PT; Chiang, YM; Belcher, AM (2006). "Virus-Enabled Synthesis and Assembly of Nanowires for Lithium Ion Battery Electrodes". Science. 312 (5775): 885–8. Bibcode:2006Sci...312..885N. doi:10.1126/science.1122716. PMID 16601154. S2CID 5105315.
- Hammond, P. T. (2004). "Form and Function in Multilayer Assembly: New Applications at the Nanoscale". Advanced Materials. 16 (15): 1271–1293. Bibcode:2004AdM....16.1271H. doi:10.1002/adma.200400760. S2CID 135521187.
- Hammond, Paula T (1999). "Recent explorations in electrostatic multilayer thin film assembly". Current Opinion in Colloid & Interface Science. 4 (6): 430–442. doi:10.1016/S1359-0294(00)00022-4.
