= Jodie Lutkenhaus =

American chemical engineer

Jodie Lutkennhaus
- Education: University of Texas at Austin; Massachusetts Institute of Technology
- Known for: Energy materials
- Scientific career
- Workplaces: University of Massachusetts Amherst; Yale University; Texas A&M University
- Doctoral advisor: Paula T. Hammond

Jodie L. Lutkenhaus is a professor of Chemical Engineering at Texas A&M University who develops redox active polymers for energy storage and smart coatings. In 2019 Lutkenhaus and Karen L. Wooley demonstrated the world's first biodegradable peptide battery. Lutkenhaus is a World Economic Forum Young Scientist.

== Early life and education ==
Lutkenhaus was inspired to study engineering by her mother and father, who studied chemistry and physics respectively. She studied chemical engineering at the University of Texas at Austin and graduated in 2002. She moved to Massachusetts Institute of Technology. After obtaining her doctoral degree there in 2007 under the supervision of Paula T. Hammond, Lutkenhaus moved to the University of Massachusetts Amherst, and then in 2008 joined the faculty of Yale University.

== Research and career ==
Lutkenhaus joined the faculty at Texas A&M University in 2010, and was promoted to associate professor in 2015. She develops new materials for energy storage and smart coatings, including polyelectrolytes and redox active polymers. She aspires to develop soft and flexible power supplies for wearable electronics that are durable, sustainable and efficient.

A challenge with using polymers in batteries is that they are typically poor at storing and exchanging electrons. Lutkenhaus has demonstrated that organic radical polymers are electrochemically active, allowing for fast charge transfer during redox reactions. If used in portable electronic devices, organic radical polymers could enable fast charging. Lutkenhaus has characterised the speed of charge transfer in these systems using an electrochemical quartz crystal microbalance. She hopes that future batteries will be metal-free, organic and recyclable. (At present, only 5% of lithium-ion batteries are recycled.) Lutkenhaus and Wooley demonstrated that glutamic acid could be used to make batteries—the first fully biodegradable protein battery. The peptides contain redox-active compounds, the stable radical Tempo on the cathode and bipyridine viologen on the anodes.

Lutkenhaus has studied how polymer films behave when deposited in confined spaces. She is developing two-dimensional transition metal-carbon nanosheets (MXenes), sheet-like structures made from layered ceramics that can include a range of different composites and functional groups. She is also investigating how chemical structure and molecular packing influence these materials' electronic properties. She has shown that MXene-polyelectrolyte devices can be used to sense humidity and pressure, as water facilitates the relaxation of charged molecular assemblies by reducing Coulombic attraction.

=== Awards and honours ===
- 2011 National Science Foundation CAREER Award
- 2012 Texas A&M Engineering Experiment Station Young Faculty
- 2013 Air Force Research Laboratory Young Investigator Prize
- 2014 Kaneka Corporation Faculty Scholarship
- 2014 3M Non-Tenured Faculty Award
- 2016 Rensselaer Polytechnic Institute Van Ness Lectureship
- 2018 American Chemical Society WCC Rising Star Award
- 2018 University of Notre Dame Thiele Lectureship
- 2018 Texas A&M University Presidential Impact Fellow
- 2019 Japanese-American-German Frontiers of Science Kavli Foundation Fellow
- 2019 World Economic Forum Young Scientist

=== Publications ===
- Lutkenhaus, Jodie L.; Hammond, Paula (2007). "Electrochemically enabled polyelectrolyte multilayer devices: from fuel cells to sensors". Soft Matter. 3 (7): 804–816. Bibcode:2007SMat....3..804L. doi:10.1039/B701203A. PMID 32900071. S2CID 18095566.
- Lutkenhaus, Jodie L.; Hammonnd, Paula (2005). "Elastomeric Flexible Free-Standing Hydrogen-Bonded Nanoscale Assemblies". Journal of the American Chemical Society. 127 (49): 17228–17234. Bibcode:2005JAChS.12717228L. doi:10.1021/ja053472s. PMID 16332070.
- Mike, Jared F.; Lutkenhaus, Jodie L. (2013). "Recent advances in conjugated polymer energy storage". Journal of Polymer Science Part B: Polymer Physics. 51 (7): 468–480. Bibcode:2013JPoSB..51..468M. doi:10.1002/polb.23256.

Lutkenhaus serves on the editorial board of ACS Macro Letters, Macromolecules and Scientific Reports.

== Personal life ==
Lutkenhaus is married to chemical engineer Ben Wilhite, also a professor at TAMU. They have two sons. Her older sister, Jessica Winter, is also a scientist.
