= John H. Dillon Medal =

John H. Dillon
- Country: United States
- Presented by: American Physical Society
- First award: 1983
- Website: https://www.aps.org/programs/honors/prizes/dillon.cfm

The John H. Dillon Medal is a medal that has been awarded annually by the American Physical Society (APS) since 1983. The recipients are young polymer physicists chosen for "outstanding accomplishment and unusual promise in research in polymer physics" One medal is awarded each year to a nominee who received their terminal degree (e.g. PhD) less than 12 years prior to nomination. The award consists of a $2,000 prize, and $1000 allowance for traveling to the APS March Meeting to present their work, and receive the medal. The award is sponsored by Elsevier.

== Recipients ==
Year	Recipient	Institution at the time award	Award for	Ref
1984	Charles C. Han			
1985	Andrew J. Lovinger		"For outstanding investigations of the structure and properties of ferroelectric polymers."	
1986	Murugappan Muthukumar			
1987	Matthew Tirrell		"In recognition of extensive research accomplishments leading to greater understanding of the diffusion and interfacial properties of polymers."	
1988	Dale S. Pearson			
1989	Frank S. Bates			
1990	Jean-Michel Guenet	CNRS at Institut Charles Sadron	"For distinguished research on polymer chain conformation in semicrystalline polymers and for major contributions to the understanding of the nature of the gel state"	
1991	Kenneth S. Schweizer			
1992	Glenn H. Fredrickson			
1993	Mark D. Ediger			
1994	Scott T. Milner			
1995	Stephen Z. D. Cheng	University of Akron	"For outstanding productivity in research on semicrystalline, liquid crystalline, and high performance polymers."	
1996	Julia A. Kornfield	California Institute of Technology	"For incisive experiments to relate microstructural dynamics to macroscopic behavior of polymer blends, block copolymers and liquid crystals."	
1997	Nitash P. Balsara	Polytechnic University	"For innovative and illuminating optical and neutron experiments to probe the state of order in multi-component polymer systems."	
1998	Spiros Haralambos Anastasiadis	University of Crete	"For pioneering studies of the structure and dynamics of polymer solutions, melts, interfaces, and thin films."	
1999	Anne M. Mayes	Massachusetts Institute of Technology	"For her unique combination of theoretical and experimental insight into polymer self-organization."	
2000	Wesley R. Burghardt	Northwestern University	"For important discoveries in the structure and flow properties of complex polymeric materials and pioneering experimental methods to study them."	
2001	Klaus Schmidt-Rohr	Iowa State University	"For his creative development of new NMR methods and their insightful use to elucidate polymer structure and dynamics."	
2002	Timothy J. Bunning	Air Force Research Laboratory	"For his outstanding accomplishments in developing polymer based materials for optical applications and for elucidating the physics and chemistry underlying their formation."	
2003	Helmut Strey	University of Massachusetts Amherst	"For contributing significantly to our understanding of the physics of biopolymers and polyelectrolytes."	
2004	Marcus Muller	Johannes Gutenberg University, Germany	"For the development of powerful analytic and computational methods, and their application to the structure and dynamics of polymers."	
2005	Jan Genzer	North Carolina State University	"For his highly creative manipulation of surface properties via monolayer and macromolecular films."	
2006	Kenji Urayama	Kyoto University	"For insightful experiments that probe the nature of polymer networks."	
2007	Darrin J. Pochan	University of Delaware	"For advancing our understanding of the physics of assembly and chain conformation of synthetic polypeptides."	
2008	Kari Dalnoki-Veress	McMaster University	"For significant and innovative experiments in glass formation and polymer crystallization at the nanoscale."	
2009	Venkat Ganesan	University of Texas at Austin	"For exceptional contributions to innovative computer simulation approaches and analysis of equilibrium and dynamic properties of multicomponent polymetric materials and nanocomposites."	
2010	Yueh-Lin Loo	Princeton University	"For insightful experiments connecting structure with performance in conducting polymers, organic electronics, and functional block copolymers"	
2011	Raffaele Mezzenga	ETH Zurich	"For exceptional contributions to the understanding of self-assembly principles and their use to design and control materials with targeted functionalities."	
2012	Rachel A. Segalman	University of California, Berkeley	"For fundamental and technological contributions to the field of polymer science and engineering, especially in the area of rod-coil block copolymers."	
2013	Mahesh Mahanthappa	University of Wisconsin	"For fundamental studies of block copolymers with controlled dispersity."	
2014	Ryan C. Hayward	University of Massachusetts Amherst	"For remarkably innovative and creative approaches to the design, realization, and analysis of responsive polymer gels and self-assembled systems."	
2015	Chinedum O. Osuji	Yale University	"For fundamental insights into block copolymer self-assembly under applied fields."	
2016	Thomas H. Epps, III	University of Delaware	"For significant advancement in the control, characterization, and understanding of polymer nanoscale-structure and energetics."	
2017	Moon J. Park	Pohang University of Science & Technology	"For incisive experiments elucidating the interplay of transport and morphology in nanostructured ion-containing polymer materials."	
2018	Bradley D. Olsen	Massachusetts Institute of Technology	"For significantly expanding our understanding of the physics of polymers, including the self-assembly of block copolymers incorporating a fully folded protein, the influence of polymer shape on diffusion; for engineering novel gels; and for updating the theory of the modulus of a network."	
2019	Zahra Fakhraai	University of Pennsylvania	"For exceptional investigations of surface effects in polymer glasses and amyloid aggregation."	
2020	Rodney Priestley	Princeton University	"For impactful experiments illuminating the glass transition, and for novel processes for the controlled formation of polymer thin films and structured nanocolloids."	
2021	Bryan W. Boudouris	Purdue University	"For fundamental insights connecting polymer structure with charge transport in free radical conducting polymers, organic electronics, and functional block copolymers."	
2022	Jian Qin	Stanford University	"For the advancement of analytical and computational tools in the thermodynamics and morphology of ionic or ion-containing polymeric materials."	
2023	Vivek Sharma	University of Illinois Chicago	"For fundamental advances toward a molecular-level understanding of non-equilibrium polymer dynamics and for developing methods to accurately measure extensional deformation of polymeric materials and interfacial flows."	
2024	Charles Sing	University of Illinois Urbana-Champaign	"For pioneering advances in polyelectrolyte phase behavior and polymer dynamics using theory and computational modeling"	
2025	Robert J. Hickey	Pennsylvania State University	"For pioneering work in creating nonequilibrium structured soft materials."	
2026	Liheng Cai	University of Virginia	"For pioneering the understanding and applications of architecturally complex polymers and networks using experiments and theory."	

== See also ==
- List of physics awards
- List of prizes named after people
