= Andy H. Tsou =

ExxonMobil materials scientist

Andy Haishung Tsou is a retired ExxonMobil materials scientist known for developing synchrotron X-ray scattering and atomic force microscopy techniques for polymer research, applying the techniques in service of development and commercialization of new polyolefin materials.

== Education ==
Tsou received the B.S. in Chemical Engineering from National Taiwan University in 1979. He earned the M.S.Chem.Eng. from Penn State University in 1983, and the Ph.D. from Purdue University in 1987 under Nicholas A. Peppas. Tsou distinguished himself by setting a record for completing the fastest PhD in the history of the lab. He completed his doctorate in 2 years, 8 months. In 1997, Tsou completed a 2-year industrial fellowship at the University of Minnesota's CIE (center of interfacial engineering). In 2016, he spent a sabbatical at the Ecole Polytechnique de Montreal.

== Career ==
Tsou began his professional career in 1983 as a photoresist engineer at Signetics. In 1987, he joined the Eastman Kodak Company as a group leader. He joined ExxonMobil Chemical company in 1998 serving at first as a project leader, then section head and finally as a senior research associate. Andy served as a thesis advisor at the Chemistry Department of Stony Brook University from 2007 to 2013, overseeing the graduation of 7 PhDs. Tsou retired from ExxonMobil in 2018. Following his retirement, Tsou joined Daxin Materials Corporation for 2 years. He is currently an adjunct professor at Beijing University of Chemical Technology and at National Taiwan University, where he teaches on Polyolefin Science and Technology.

He was previously an associate editor of the journal Rubber Chemistry and Technology. He served on the University of Akron's Advancement Council, at the request of the dean of the college of Polymer Science and Polymer Engineering.

Tsou's most cited works treated the subject of shear flow induced crystallization of polypropylene using x-ray scattering, and his work with atomic force microscopy. Tsou's microscopy work has been featured by commercial AFM manufacturers. He was a co-Principal Investigator on NSF-funded work on additives for novel polymer morphology and performance at Massachusetts Institute of Technology.

== Patents ==
Tsou is a prolific inventor with more than 100 patents. His inventions include low permeability nanocomposites, functionalized elastomer nanocomposites, and oriented thermoplastic vulcanizates

== Awards and recognition ==
- 2000 - Frank Giblin Memorial Award in Polymer Analysis from Society of Plastics Engineers
- 2004 - Sparks–Thomas award from the ACS Rubber Division
- 2015 - (with Benjamin Hsiao) Cooperative Research Award in Polymer Science and Engineering, Polymeric Materials: Science and Engineering Division of the American Chemical Society
