= Fikile Brushett =

Fikile R. Brushett is an American chemical engineer and researcher known for his contributions to electrochemical energy storage and sustainable energy technologies. He is the Chevron Professor of Chemical Engineering at Massachusetts Institute of Technology (MIT), where he has been recognized for his work in developing next-generation energy storage systems. Brushett's achievements include numerous awards, such as the U.S. Department of Energy Secretary's Achievement Award, the NOBCChE Lloyd N. Ferguson Young Scientist Award, and the Allan P. Colburn Award.

== Education ==
Fikile Brushett received a B.S.E. degree in chemical and biomolecular engineering at the University of Pennsylvania in 2006. In 2009, he received a M.S. degree in chemical engineering at the University of Illinois at Urbana-Champaign where, in 2010, he finished with a Ph.D. in chemical engineering as well. After he trained at the Argonne National Laboratory in the Electrochemical Energy Storage Group as a Director’s Postdoctoral Fellow from 2010-2012.

== Career ==
Fikile Brushett began his career as a Director’s Postdoctoral Fellow in the Electrochemical Energy Storage Group at Argonne National Laboratory from 2010 to 2012. In 2013, he joined the faculty at the Massachusetts Institute of Technology (MIT) as an assistant professor in the Department of Chemical Engineering. He later became the Cecil and Ida Green Career Development Professor. In 2024, Brushett was named the Chevron Professor of Chemical Engineering at MIT.

Brushett's research focuses on electrochemical energy storage systems, with an emphasis on redox flow batteries and sustainable energy solutions. He has worked on designing and improving energy storage devices to enhance their efficiency, durability, and cost-effectiveness.

Brushett's interest of research includes "electrochemical energy conversion and storage, microfluidics, interfacial phenomena, catalyst synthesis, and tomography."

== Awards and honors ==
- Brushett was awarded a GEM Fellowship for Ph.D. in Engineering in 2006.
- In 2010, he was awarded a Director’s Postdoctoral Fellowship at Argonne National Laboratory.
- In 2014 and 2017, Brushett was awarded the C. Michael Mohr Outstanding Faculty Award at MIT.
- He was awarded the Scialog Fellow for Advanced Energy Storage and the Chemical and Engineering News Talented 12 Chemistry resulting in the nickname "Baron of Batteries".
- In 2018 he earned the U.S. Department of Energy, Secretary of Energy Achievement Award. In the same year, Brushett gained the ECS Supramaniam Srinivasan Young Investigator Award.
- In 2020, he was awarded the NOBCChE Lloyd N. Ferguson Young Scientist Award for Excellence in Research.
- In 2021, Brushett was awarded the NESACS/NENOBCChE Henry A. Hill Lecturership. In 2022, he was awarded the Allan P. Colburn Award.
