= Zahra Fakhraai =

Iranian-Canadian materials scientist

- Born: Iran
- Education: Sharif University of Technology; University of Waterloo
- Awards: APS John H. Dillon Medal (2019)
- Scientific career
- Workplaces: University of Pennsylvania; University of Wisconsin–Madison; University of Toronto

Zahra Fakhraai is an Iranian-Canadian materials scientist who is a professor of chemistry at the University of Pennsylvania. Fakhraai does research focused on glass transition, nonlinear optics, nanoparticle plasmonics, and polymer physics. She studies the impact of nanoconfinement on the structure of materials. She was awarded the 2019 American Physical Society John H. Dillon Medal. Fakhraai was one of the researchers to start laying the ground work to better understand the optical properties of glass.

== Early life and education ==
Fakhraai studied physics at Sharif University of Technology. She graduated with a bachelor's degree in physics in 1999 and a master's degree in 2001. She moved to the University of Waterloo for her graduate studies, earning a PhD in 2007. She worked on thin polymer films and how they interact with surfaces. Farkhraai joined the University of Toronto as a postdoctoral fellow, working with Gilbert Walker. She moved to University of Wisconsin–Madison as a Natural Sciences and Engineering Research Council fellow, where she worked with Mark Ediger.

== Career ==
Fakhraai was appointed to the University of Pennsylvania as an assistant professor in 2011. She is a co-director of REACT (Research and Education in Active Coating Technologies for the Human Habitat), a program which trains students to develop new coating for disaster relief. She studies material properties at small length scales and slow dynamics. Specifically, she is interested in glassy materials at interfaces. Her group demonstrated that below the glass transition temperature, the interfacial dynamics of materials are orders of magnitude faster than dynamics in the bulk. They investigate how this mobile interfacial layer impacts the properties of the materials.

Understanding the dynamics of the interfacial layer permits Fakhraai to produce glasses that are near-equilibrium at temperatures lower than their glass transition temperature, using physical vapour deposition. The glass transition temperature represents the temperature at which a system is unable to reach an equilibrium on lab timescales. Physical vapour deposition allows each molecule that is deposited on the surface to experience enhanced mobility, allowing them to reach their lowest energy state. She studies how chemical structure and fabrication techniques impact the optoelectronic properties of thin films, including their birefringence and charge transport. She demonstrated that it is possible to make amorphous phases of glass at high density.

Fakhraai's group have developed synthetic routes to create dielectric-core gold nanoparticles. These nanoparticles can be used for surface-enhanced Raman spectroscopy, biological sensing and temperature monitoring. Their random molecular packing results in an inherently disordered structure and magnetic dipole plasmons. Her recent work has looked at the surface assembly and adhesion of amyloid aggregates using atomic force microscopy. Her group have developed high resolution characterisation techniques to study amyloid aggregates in aqueous conditions. She also studies the growth of peptides and proteins in two- and three-dimensions, as well as supercooled liquids.

Fakhraai was concerned about the impact of Donald Trump's travel ban and has spoken about the need to support students protected by the DACA program. She is an advocate for women in science, and has urged social scientists to consider the agency and humanity of women scientists when talking about a so-called gender-equality paradox.

Fakhraai collaborated with Tianyi Liu and Patrick Walsh, a chemistry professor. They designed and synthesised a new molecule with a perfect spherical shape. This unique molecule can never align themselves with any substrate as they are deposited. Results were these stable glasses are birefringent, a surprising result in a round material.

== Awards and honours ==
- 2007 American Physical Society Frank Padden Award
- 2013 National Science Foundation CAREER Award
- 2015 Sloan Research Fellowship
- 2017 American Chemical Society Journal of Physical Chemistry B Lectureship Award
- 2018 University of Pennsylvania Fellow
- 2019 American Physical Society John H. Dillon Medal
- 2021 Rising Star Award from the Women Chemists Committee of the American Chemical Society
- 2024 American Physical Society Division of Polymer Physics Fellowship
