= Raffaele Mezzenga =

Italian condensed matter physicist

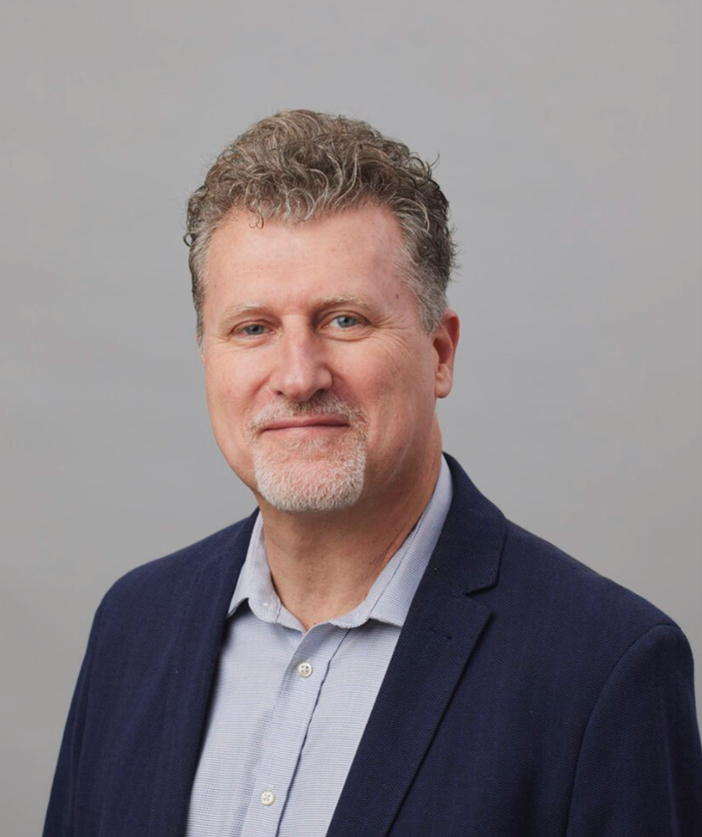
- Born: Raffaele Mezzenga; Terni, Italy
- Citizenship: Italian
- Education: PhD, École Polytechnique Fédérale de Lausanne; MSc, University of Perugia
- Known for: Protein and amyloid self-assembly; Soft-matter and colloidal physics; Sustainable materials and water purification technologies
- Awards: John H. Dillon Medal (2011); Fellow of the American Physical Society (2017); Spark Award, ETH Zurich (2019); ECIS–Syensqo Award (2025)
- Scientific career
- Fields: Soft matter physics; Polymer physics; Materials science
- Workplaces: ETH Zurich

Raffaele Mezzenga is an Italian soft matter scientist specializing in polymer physics, liquid crystals, protein aggregation and nanotechnology. He is a Full Professor at the Swiss Federal Institute of Technology Zurich (ETH Zurich), where he leads the Laboratory of Food and Soft Materials. His research is known for translating fundamental concepts of colloidal science and self-assembly into applications for environmental remediation, nutrition, and health technologies. He is a Fellow of the American Physical Society and is among the 0.1% most cited scientists according to the Clarivate 2023 & 2026 Highly Cited Researchers list in the cross-field discipline.

== Education ==
Mezzenga was born in Terni, Italy. He studied materials science at the University of Perugia, where he obtained a Master of Science (MSc), cum laude, in 1997. His master's thesis, conducted in collaboration with the European Organization for Nuclear Research (CERN) and NASA in Houston, focused on interactions between polymers and elementary particles for application to the Alpha Magnetic Spectrometer.

He completed his doctoral studies at the École Polytechnique Fédérale de Lausanne (EPFL) in 2001, working on polymer thermodynamic and earning a PhD in the field of Polymer Physics - Materials Science.

== Academic and professional career ==
From 1995 to 1997, Mezzenga worked as a research assistant at CERN, in collaboration with NASA (NASA Space Shuttle Discovery mission STS91). He then served as a research assistant at EPFL from 1997 to 2001. Following the completion of his PhD, he was a postdoctoral fellow at the University of California, Santa Barbara (2001–2002), where he studied self-assembly phenomena in polymer and colloidal systems.

In 2003, Mezzenga joined the Nestlé Research Center in Lausanne as a senior scientist in polymers and colloids physics. From 2005 to 2009, he held a joint appointment as associate professor of physics at the University of Fribourg and researcher at the Nestlé Research Center.

In 2009, Mezzenga was appointed Full Professor at ETH Zurich where he founded, and continues to lead since, the Laboratory of Food and Soft Materials.

Mezzenga has held visiting professorships at several institutions, including Aalto University (formerly Helsinki University of Technology), Monash University, RMIT University, Nanyang Technological University, the University of Cagliari, Sapienza University of Rome, and Indian Institute of Technology Kharagpur.

== Research ==
=== Soft-matter and colloidal physics ===
Mezzenga's research focuses on the physics of self-assembly in polymers, surfactants, proteins, and biological colloids. A central theme of his work is the application of polymer and colloidal physics concepts to complex biological systems, particularly amyloid fibrils and other chiral filamentous materials such as nanocellulose.

In 2010, Mezzenga and collaborators developed a statistical and theoretical framework for understanding amyloid fibril aggregation based on the analysis of atomic force microscopy images. This work introduced a polymer-physics-based methodology to study amyloid fibrils that has since been applied broadly to filamentous colloidal systems. In 2018, his group solved a long-standing conundrum in biological liquid crystals by discovering cholesteric phases in amyloid fibrils, which were previously known to form nematic phases but were thought to lack the chiral nematic form.

=== Protein-based materials and sustainability ===
A major strand of Mezzenga's work concerns the development of protein-derived and food-based materials as sustainable platforms for advanced technologies. His group has pioneered the use of amyloid fibrils as building blocks for functional nanocomposites, including biodegradable materials with sensing and shape-memory properties.

In 2016, Mezzenga and collaborators reported amyloid–carbon hybrid membranes for universal water purification. The technology exploits supramolecular metal–ligand interactions between heavy-metal ions and protein amyloid fibrils, allowing simultaneous removal of a wide range of contaminants with high binding affinities. The membranes exhibit unusually high permeability, enabling operation with minimal energy input. This research led to patented technologies and the creation of an ETH Zurich spin-off company, BluAct Technologies, which has tested and deployed the approach in multiple countries.

Mezzenga has also contributed to the development of conceptual frameworks for evaluating the sustainability of water purification technologies at large, emphasizing energy efficiency and material performance.

=== Health, nutrition, and biomedical applications ===
Mezzenga's research extends into nutrition and health. In 2017, his group developed amyloid-based systems capable of reducing, stabilizing, and delivering bioavailable nanosized iron, addressing iron deficiency and anaemia. The work resulted in a patented technology, which in 2025 was validated via clinical studies in iron-deficient women and expanded to human nutrition.

In 2023, Mezzenga and collaborators demonstrated that food-derived amyloid fibrils are safe ingredients for human nutrition, based on comparative in vitro and in vivo digestion studies. This work introduced food amyloids as functional ingredients in health and nutrition research, significantly expanding the scope of food-based amyloids.

Additional applications developed by his group include amyloid aerogels for the removal of organic pollutants from water, antiviral filtration membranes capable of trapping and inactivating enveloped and non-enveloped viruses, recovery of gold from electronic waste using protein-based aerogels derived from food-industry by-products, and catalytic amyloid hydrogels for alcohol detoxification.

== Awards and honours ==
- ECIS–Syensqo Award, European Colloid and Interface Society (2025)
- SPARC Professorship, Indian Institute of Technology Kharagpur (2025)
- Highly Cited Researcher, Clarivate (2023)
- Spark Award for the best invention of the year, ETH Zurich (2019)
- Fellow of the American Physical Society (2017)
- Biomacromolecules/Macromolecules Young Investigator Award, American Chemical Society (2013)
- John H. Dillon Medal, American Physical Society (2011)
- Young Scientist Research Award, American Oil Chemists’ Society (2011)
- Swiss National Science Foundation Professeur Boursier Award (2004)

Mezzenga served as an executive, associate and guest editor for various journals including Food Biophysics, Food Hydrocolloids, Polymer International, Trends in Food Science, and has been a board member of the Swiss Chemical Society. for over 15 years.

== Selected publications ==
- Bolisetty, S.; Peydayesh, M.; Mezzenga, R. (2019). “Sustainable technologies for water purification from heavy metals: review and analysis.” Chemical Society Reviews 48 (2): 463–487.
- Wei, G.; Su, Z.; Reynolds, N. P.; Arosio, P.; Hamley, I. W.; Gazit, E.; Mezzenga, R. (2017). “Self-assembling peptide and protein amyloids: from structure to tailored function in nanotechnology.” Chemical Society Reviews 46 (15): 4661–4708.
- Mezzenga, R.; Schurtenberger, P.; Burbidge, A.; Michel, M. (2005). “Understanding foods as soft materials.” Nature Materials 4 (10): 729–740.
- Nasrabadi, M. N.; Doost, A. S.; Mezzenga, R. (2021). “Modification approaches of plant-based proteins to improve their techno-functionality and use in food products.” Food Hydrocolloids 118: 106789.
- Adamcik, J.; Jung, J. M.; Flakowski, J.; De Los Rios, P.; Dietler, G.; Mezzenga, R. (2010). “Understanding amyloid aggregation by statistical analysis of atomic force microscopy images.” Nature Nanotechnology 5 (6): 423–428.
- Bolisetty, S.; Mezzenga, R. (2016). “Amyloid–carbon hybrid membranes for universal water purification.” Nature Nanotechnology 11 (4): 365–371.
- Cao, Y.; Mezzenga, R. (2019). “Food protein amyloid fibrils: origin, structure, formation, characterization, applications and health implications.” Advances in Colloid and Interface Science 269: 334–356.
- I. Usov, G. Nyström, J. Adamcik, S. Handschin, C. Schütz, A. Fall, L. Bergström & R. Mezzenga (2015). Understanding nanocellulose chirality and structure–properties relationship at the single fibril level. Nature Communications, 6, 7564. https://doi.org/10.1038/ncomms8564
- J. Su, P. Wang, W. Zhou, M. Peydayesh, J. Zhou, T. Jin, F. Donat, C. Jin, L. Xia, K. Wang, F. Ren, P. Van der Meeren, F. Pelayo García de Arquer & R. Mezzenga (2024). Single-site iron-anchored amyloid hydrogels as catalytic platforms for alcohol detoxification. Nature Nanotechnology, 19(8), 1168–1177. https://doi.org/10.1038/s41565-024-01657-7
- J. Zhou, S. Gowachirapant, C. Zeder, A. Wieczorek, J. Guth, I. Kutzli, S. Siol, F. von Meyenn, M. B. Zimmermann & R. Mezzenga (2025). Oat protein nanofibril–iron hybrids offer a stable, high-absorption iron delivery platform for iron fortification. Nature Food, 6, 1164–1175. https://doi.org/10.1038/s43016-025-01260-6
- J. Adamcik & R. Mezzenga (2018). Amyloid polymorphism in the protein folding and aggregation energy landscape. Angewandte Chemie International Edition, 57(28), 8370–8382. https://doi.org/10.1002/anie.201713416
- D. Xu, J. Zhou, W.L. Soon, I. Kutzli, A. Molière, S. Diedrich, M. Radiom, S. Handschin, B. Li, L. Li, S. J. Sturla, C. Y. Ewald, R. Mezzenga (2023). Food amyloid fibrils are safe nutrition ingredients based on in-vitro and in-vivo assessment. Nature Communications, 14(1), 6806. https://doi.org/10.1038/s41467-023-42486-x
