= Monica Olvera de la Cruz =

Soft-matter theorist

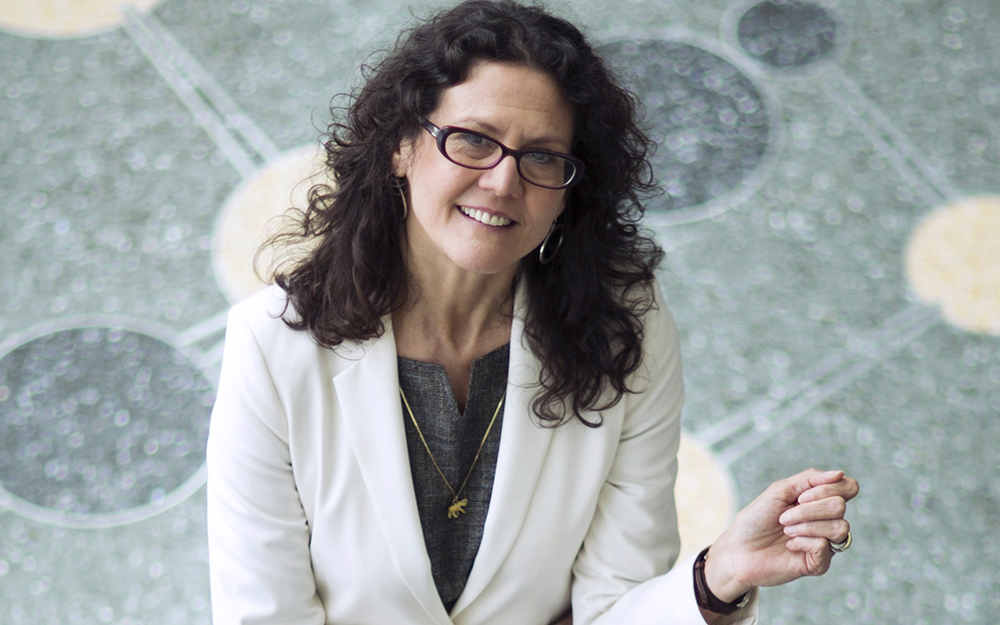
- Olvera de la Cruz in 2010
- Born: Acapulco
- Education: UNAM; Trinity College, Cambridge
- Known for: soft matter physics electrolytes
- Awards: Presidential Young Investigator Award (1990); National Academy of Sciences Cozzarelli Prize (2007); American Physical Society Polymer Physics Prize (2017)
- Scientific career
- Fields: Physics, Materials Science and Engineering, Chemistry
- Workplaces: Northwestern University
- Doctoral advisor: Sir Sam Edwards
- Doctoral students: Anne M. Mayes
- Website: http://aztec.tech.northwestern.edu

Monica Olvera de la Cruz is a Mexican born, American and French soft-matter theorist who is the Lawyer Taylor Professor of Materials Science and Engineering and Professor of Chemistry, and by courtesy Professor of Physics and Astronomy and of Chemical and Biological Engineering, at Northwestern University.

== Biography ==
Olvera de la Cruz obtained her B.A. in Physics from the UNAM, Mexico, in 1981, and her Ph.D. in Physics from Cambridge University, UK, in 1985. She has been a faculty member at Northwestern University since 1986. From 1995–97, she worked as a Senior Staff Scientist at the Commissariat a l'Energie Atomique, Centre de'Etude, Saclay, France. Olvera de la Cruz is a member of the U.S. National Academy of Sciences as well as the American Philosophical Society and a fellow of the American Academy of Arts and Sciences and the American Physical Society.

She directed the Northwestern Materials Research Center from 2006–2013. She is currently the Director of the Center for Computation and Theory of Soft Materials (CCTSM) at Northwestern University.

== Research ==
Olvera de la Cruz has developed novel methods to analyze complex systems, and in particular molecular electrolytes. She explained the limitations associated with separating long DNA chains via gel electrophoresis dynamics, which was of great importance to the Human Genome Project.

Olvera de la Cruz discovered that counterions induce the precipitation of strongly charged polyelectrolytes by including electrostatic correlations in the analysis. Her work provided a completely revised model of electrostatic effects in complex electrolytes and in dielectrically heterogeneous media.

She has described the emergence of shape and patterns in membranes and in multicomponent complex mixtures. She and her students and postdocs discovered that electrostatics leads to spontaneous symmetry breaking in ionic membranes such as viral capsids (for which they were awarded the 2007 Cozzarelli Prize) and in fibers.

They also demonstrated the spontaneous emergence of various regular and irregular polyhedral geometries in closed membranes with non-homogeneous elastic properties such as bacterial microcompartments, including carboxysomes, via a mechanism that explains observed shapes in crystalline shells formed by more than one component such as archaea and organelle wall envelopes as well as in ionic vesicles.

By simulating crystals of DNA functionalized nanoparticles with complementary linkers containing both small and large nanoparticles, the Olvera de la Cruz group discovered colloidal crystal "metallicity", whereby small colloids become delocalized within a larger crystal structure. They noted that the transition from the localized to delocalized state is analogous to an insulator-metal transition. Recently, she and her students showed that the localization-delocalization transition is phonon-driven. Additionally, when a localization-delocalization transition is accompanied with a crystal phase transition, it strongly resembles a Peierls transition. This transition is also found in oppositely charged colloidal crystals, resembling sublattice melting in atomic superionics.

Olvera de la Cruz and Qiao found that the binding of the SARS-CoV-2 spike protein receptor-binding domain (RBD) to the human cell receptor hACE2 can be strongly decreased by mutating or blocking the polybasic cleavage site (known as the furin cleavage site), providing a mechanism to decrease COVID-19 infection, as subsequently demonstrated experimentally.

== Awards and honors ==
- 1989 David and Lucile Packard Foundation Fellowship in Science and Engineering.
- 1990 Alfred P. Sloan Fellowship.
- 1990 National Science Foundation Presidential Young Investigator Award.
- 2001 Elected Fellow of the American Physical Society
- 2007 Cozzarelli Prize, Proceedings of the National Academy of Sciences (PNAS).
- 2010 National Security Science and Engineering Faculty Fellow.
- 2010 Fellow of the American Academy of Arts and Sciences.
- 2012 Member of the National Academy of Sciences.
- 2017 Polymer Physics Prize
- 2020 Member of the American Philosophical Society
- 2020 Mérito Guillermo Soberón
- 2023 Mulliken Medal and Award of the University of Chicago

== Policy and public service ==
Olvera de la Cruz was on the US Department of Energy's Basic Energy Sciences Advisory Committee from 2012–2022, and has been on the United States National Research Council since 2005. From 2005 to 2008, she was on the Mathematical and Physical Sciences Directorate Advisory Committee of the National Science Foundation. She is on the advisory boards of the Max Planck Institute for Polymer Research in Mainz and the École Supérieure de Physique et de Chimie Industrielles de la Ville de Paris (ESPCI Paris). She is currently on the editorial board for the Proceedings of the National Academy of Sciences of the United States of America, and is a member of the Gordon Research Conferences' Board of Trustees. She has been a Senior Editor for the journal ACS Central Science (2015–2022).
