= Timothy P. Lodge =

American polymer scientist

- Born: 11 April 1954 (age 72); Manchester, England
- Citizenship: United States
- Education: Harvard University; University of Wisconsin–Madison
- Known for: Advances in polymer chain dynamics; block copolymer self-assembly; polymer education
- Awards: Elected to American Academy of Arts and Sciences (2016), Herman F. Mark Polymer Chemistry Award (2015), Regents Professorship (2013 - Present), ACS Award in Polymer Chemistry (2010), APS Polymer Physics Prize (2004)
- Scientific career
- Fields: Chemistry, Polymer Science
- Workplaces: University of Minnesota
- Doctoral advisor: John Schrag

Timothy P. Lodge (born 11 April 1954) is an American polymer scientist.

Lodge is a Regents Professor (2013–present), an Institute of Technology Distinguished Professor (2004–present), and a Distinguished McKnight University Professor (2001–present) in the Department of Chemistry and the Department of Chemical Engineering and Materials Science at the University of Minnesota, Twin Cities, Minneapolis-Saint Paul, Minnesota where he has been a faculty member since 1982. He served as the Editor-in-Chief of the American Chemical Society journal Macromolecules for 17 years (2001–2017) and as the founding editor of ACS Macro Letters (2011–2018).

He is recognized for his research in polymer science, especially fundamental explorations of polymer chain dynamics in miscible blends, block polymers, multicompartment micelles and polymers in ionic liquids. According to Web of Science, he has produced 331 published works that have been cited over 12,400 times, with an h-index of 62 as of April 6, 2014. He is also co-author, with Paul Hiemenz, of the textbook, Polymer Chemistry, 2nd edition.

== Background and personal life ==
Timothy P. Lodge was born in Manchester, England, a son of Helen and Arthur S. Lodge. He moved permanently to the United States in 1968. He received his A. B. degree in applied mathematics from Harvard University in 1975. Working under the mentorship of Professor John Schrag at the University of Wisconsin, Madison, Lodge received his Ph.D. in chemistry in 1980. His dissertation was titled, "Oscillatory Flow Birefringence of Dilute Polymer Solutions: Concentration Dependence and High Frequency Behavior." Upon graduation, Lodge collaborated with Dr. Charles Han as a National Research Council Postdoctoral Associate at the National Bureau of Standards (now the National Institute of Standards and Technology). Lodge and his wife have two children.

== Contributions to polymer science ==
Lodge is internationally recognized for his seminal contributions in numerous areas of polymer science. The focus of his work has been on achieving a molecular-level understanding of polymer structure and dynamics in multicomponent systems and mixtures, and to understand how these are affected by the thermodynamic interactions amongst the components.

Polymer chain dynamics: Lodge's early work focused on the chain dynamics of polymers in solution and in miscible blends. In particular, Lodge and McLeish (2000) discussed the effect of local composition on the dynamics of polymers in a miscible blend. Their model was based on two simple assumptions. First, that dynamic heterogeneity occurs over a length scale on the order of a Kuhn length of the chain. Second, that each polymer in the blend experiences a 'self-concentration' that is higher than the bulk (average) composition, due to chain connectivity over this length scale. The impact is that the local dynamics of the two polymers in the blend may exhibit different dependencies on temperature and overall composition due to differences in local composition. This leads to a breakdown in time-temperature superposition, and the appearance of two distinct glass transition temperatures in the mixture.

Block copolymer solutions: Lodge's research group has maintained long-standing interest in the self-assembly of block copolymers in solutions. Studying the phase behavior of polystyrene-block-polyisoprene in solvents of varying selectivity, the concept of phase trajectories was introduced to explain the phase sequences observed as a function of concentration in neutral and selective solvents connecting the solution behavior to that seen in block copolymer melts. From this foundation, the thermodynamics and kinetics of polymorphic order-order transitions were investigated. One paper of note demonstrated the thermoreversible, epitaxial face-centered cubic to body-centered cubic transition in highly ordered, micellar block copolymer solutions and its similarity to transitions observed in atomic systems (e.g. metals and alloys) supporting the general nature of the occurrence of this phase transition in materials.

Miktoarm Star Polymers: In 2004, Lodge published the seminal paper on the self-assembly of miktoarm star terpolymers in solution; a paper that has been cited over 600 times. Using ABC miktoarm star polymers the first example of multicomponent block copolymer micelles was shown, driven by the mutual incompatibility of the hydrophilic A and hydrophobic B and C blocks. In a subsequent paper the simultaneous, segregated storage of two different chromophores in the different micelle domains was demonstrated, offering potential for use in chemical delivery in fields such as pharmaceuticals, personal care products, and foodstuffs.

Polymers in Ionic Liquids: Lodge's recent work has focused on the self-assembly of block copolymers in ionic liquids. Ionic liquids are considered by many to be "green" solvents due to their vanishing vapor pressure, fire resistance, as well as their excellent chemical and thermal stability over wide temperature ranges. Besides elucidating the assembly properties of block copolymers in ionic liquids, Lodge has used these materials to produce molecular shuttles, gas separation membranes, and ion gel gate dielectrics for use in polymer thin film transistors.

Education in Polymer Science: Lodge is a co-author of Polymer Chemistry, 2nd Edition, written with Paul Hiemenz (2007). In 2012 he was elected to the University of Minnesota Academy of Distinguished Teachers, and he received the Postbaccalaureate, Graduate, and Professional Education Award.

Lodge is the co-holder of four patents.

== Awards, honors, and professional service ==
For his research and education efforts, Lodge has received numerous awards including:

- 1993 Institute of Technology George Taylor Distinguished Research Award
- 1993 Fellow of the American Physical Society
- 1994, 2002 National Science Foundation Special Creativity Award
- 1994 Fellow of the Humphrey Institute Policy Forum, 1994-95
- 1998 Arthur K. Doolittle Award, American Chemical Society
- 1999 EPSRC Visiting Fellow, University of Leeds
- 2004 American Physical Society Polymer Physics Prize
- 2004 Paul Flory Polymer Research Award, POLYCHAR
- 2007 Nelson W. Taylor Award in Materials Science, Penn State University
- 2007–2011 Lloyd H. Reyerson Professor of Chemistry
- 2009 Fellow of the American Association for the Advancement of Science
- 2009 International Scientist Award, Society of Polymer Science Japan
- 2010 Award in Polymer Chemistry, American Chemical Society
- 2010 Fellow of the American Chemical Society
- 2012 Elected to University of Minnesota Academy of Distinguished Teachers
- 2015 Herman F. Mark Award
- 2016 Elected to American Academy of Arts and Sciences

Lodge has been a Visiting Professor at the University of California, Santa Barbara (1991-2, Chemical Engineering), University of Mainz, Germany (1998, Institute for Physical Chemistry) and Kyoto University (1985; 1992; 1994, Department of Polymer Chemistry)

Since 2005, Lodge has been the director of the NSF-funded Materials Research Science and Engineering Center at Minnesota. The Center currently focuses on materials development in: (1) Engineered Multiblock Polymers, (2) Organic Optoelectronic Interfaces, (3) Magnetic Heterostructures, and (4) Nanoparticle-based Materials.

Lodge has served the broader scientific community as the Editor-in-Chief for the American Chemical Society journals Macromolecules and ACS Macro Letters. He has served as Chair Elect, Vice Chair, Chair (1995-1998) and Councilor (2001-2006) for the American Physical Society Division of Polymer Physics.
