= Biomacromolecules =

- Discipline: Chemistry, polymer science
- Language: English
- Edited by: Sébastien Lecommandoux

Publication details
- History: 2000–present
- Publisher: American Chemical Society (United States)
- Frequency: Monthly
- Impact factor: 5.5 (2023)

Standard abbreviations
- ISO 4: Biomacromolecules

Indexing
- CODEN: bomaf6
- ISSN: 1525-7797 (print); 1526-4602 (web)
- OCLC no.: 41669992

Links
- Journal homepage; Online access

Biomacromolecules is a peer-reviewed scientific journal published since 2000 by the American Chemical Society. It is abstracted and indexed in Chemical Abstracts Service, Scopus, EBSCOhost, PubMed, and Science Citation Index Expanded.

The current editor-in-chief is Sébastien Lecommandoux (Université de Bordeaux). According to the Journal Citation Reports, the journal has a 2022 impact factor of 6.2.

== See also ==
- Macromolecules (journal)
- ACS Macro Letters
