= Anne M. Mayes =

Material science and engineer

Anne Marie Mayes
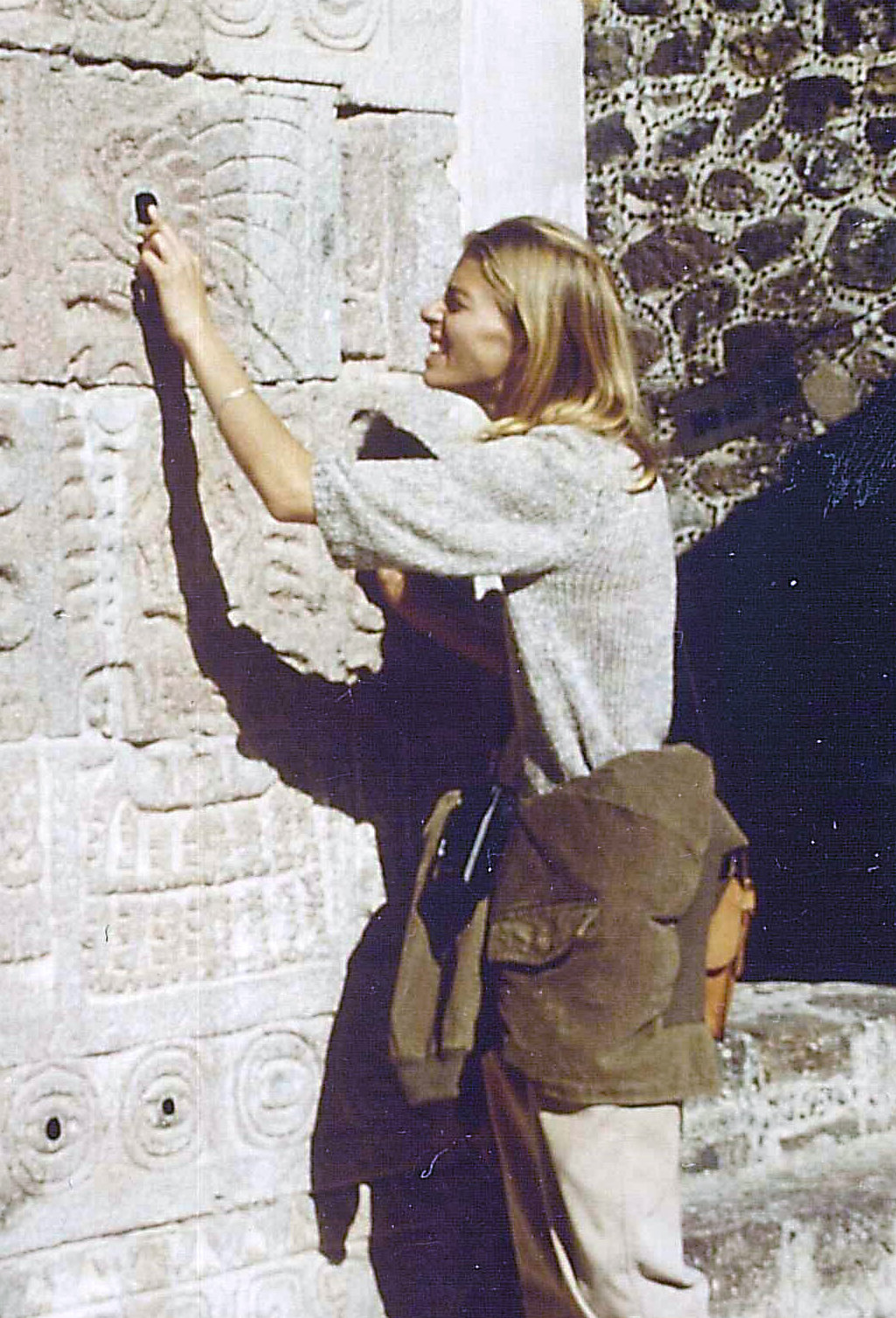
- Anne Mayes in Mexico
- Born: August 30, 1964; Aurora, Illinois, United States
- Died: January 25, 2011 (aged 46); Mustang, Oklahoma

Academic background
- Education: Massachusetts Institute of Technology; Northwestern University
- Thesis: A study of transitions to periodic structures in block copolymer melts. (1991)
- Doctoral advisor: Monica Olvera de la Cruz

Anne Marie Mayes (August 30, 1964 – January 25, 2011) was an American material science and engineer and a Toyota professor at Massachusetts Institute of Technology (MIT), and MacVicar faculty fellow until 2006. She was the first woman to be promoted from assistant professor to tenured professor in the Department of Materials Science and Engineering at MIT. Mayes focused her research on lithium polymer batteries and the role of polymers in environmental issues. The Anne M. Mayes '86 Fellowship for graduate students at MIT is named in her honor.

== Education ==
Mayes graduated Mustang High School in Mustang, Oklahoma in 1982. She went on to study and earn a Bachelor of Science in Materials Science and Engineering from Massachusetts Institute of Technology(MIT) in 1986. She obtained her Ph.D. in Materials Science and Engineering from Northwestern University in 1991. At Northwestern University, Mayes was advised by Monica Olvera de la Cruz. Her Ph.D. research focused phase diagram of block copolymers. After completing her Ph.D., Mayes worked two years as visiting scientist at IBM's Alameda Research Center with Thomas P. Russell.

== Career and research ==
In 1993 Mayes joined MIT as an assistant professor in the Department of Materials Science and Engineering. In 1997 she became the first female professor to receive tenure in the Department of Materials Science and Engineering at MIT.

Mayes research led to breakthroughs in many topics, including the development of polymeric electrolytes for lithium-ion batteries, cell-signaling biomaterials, membranes for water purification, block copolymer films for nanolithography, and weak polyelectrolyte multilayer assemblies. One of her major development was “baroplastics,” a plastic that becomes soft under pressure, which allowed for recycling with less energy and without degradation.

In 2006 Mayes retired early from MIT due to illness and helped create the Anne M. Mayes '86 Fellowship for graduate students with her remaining discretionary funds.

Overall, Mayes supervised sixteen Ph.D. candidates, seven M.S. degrees, and a host of undergraduate researchers. Mayes had 13 patents, over 100 publications. Beyond research, she was dedicated to her students in the classroom, for this she was named a MacVicar faculty fellow in "recognition of her outstanding teaching innovations" and other teaching awards.

== Awards and honors ==
- 2007 Carl S. Marvel Creative Polymer Chemistry Award
- 2004 Neutron Scattering Society of America Exceptional Service Award
- 2003 Fellow of the American Physical Society
- 2003-2006 Toyota Chair, MIT
- 2003 OMNOVA Solutions Signature University Award for Outstanding Research in Polymers
- 2002 Materials Research Society Woody Award
- 2001-2006 MIT MacVicar Faculty Fellow
- 1999 John H. Dillon Medal of the American Physical Society
- 1998 Materials Research Society Outstanding Young Investigator Award

== Personal life ==
In 1994 Mayes was diagnosed with breast cancer. When three surgeries and intense chemotherapy failed, she underwent a clinical trial that eradicated the cancer in 1997 but left her immune system compromised.

Mayes married Glenn Mailand in 2004. After Mayes retired from MIT in 2006, she moved back to her hometown of Mustang, Oklahoma. Mayes died on January 25, 2011.
