= Marcus Muller =

South African actor

- Born: Marcus Muller; 26 July 1970 (age 55); South Africa
- Occupations: Actor, Writer, Producer, Model
- Years active: 2007–present
- Spouse: Therese Benade (2007-2014)

Marcus Muller is a South African actor, writer, producer and model. He is the Mr. South Africa in 2006. He is most notable for the roles in the films Kampterrein, Droomdag, 70X7: Sewentig Maal Sewe and the soap operas Egoli: Place of Gold, Villa Rose and 7de Laan.

== Personal life ==
He had a long standing relationship with fellow actress Therese Benade since 2007. They later separated in 2014.

== Career ==
In 2006, Muller won the Mr. South Africa pageant, which made his turning point of the career. After winning the pageant, he was selected to the popular soap opera Egoli: Place of Gold with the role of legal adviser "Liam de Lange". He continued to play the role for three seasons: 16, 17 and 18, from 2007 to 2010. Then in 2015, he made his film debut with 70X7: Sewentig Maal Sewe directed by Willie Olwage. After the success of the film, he made two more popular roles in the films O Vet! and Droomdag. In 2017, he wrote and produced the comedy film Kampterrein which was directed by Luhann Jansen. In 2016, he joined the cast of soapie 7de Laan.

== Filmography ==
Year	Film	Role	Genre	Ref.
2007-2010	Egoli: Place of Gold	Liam de Lange	TV series	
2015	70X7: Sewentig Maal Sewe	Pieter	Film	
2016	Die Muse	Anton Malan	Short film	
2016	O Vet!	Daniel Ferreira	Film	
2017	Seepglad	Dr. Corné Kriek	TV series	
2017	Droomdag	Dr. Marko Greef	Film	
2017	Die Man met die Snor	Kurt Stahl	Short film	
2017	Die Sangoma Sindroom	Eugene	Short film	
2017	Kampterrein	Scriptwriter, Producer	Film	
2018	Skeem Saam	Petrol Client	TV series	
2021	7de Laan	Andre Vosloo	TV series	
