= Journal of Membrane Science =

- Discipline: Chemistry
- Language: English
- Edited by: Rong Wang and Jerry Y. S. Lin

Publication details
- History: 1976–present
- Publisher: Elsevier
- Impact factor: 9.5 (2022)

Standard abbreviations
- ISO 4: J. Membr. Sci.

Indexing
- CODEN: JMESDO
- ISSN: 0376-7388

Links
- Journal homepage

The Journal of Membrane Science is a peer-reviewed scientific journal, established by Harry Lonsdale, covering research on membrane permeation, selectivity, formation, structure, fouling, processing and application. The editor-in-chief is Jerry Y. S. Lin (Arizona State University, Tempe, Arizona, United States) and Rong Wang (Nanyang Technological University, Singapore, Singapore). According to the Journal Citation Reports, the journal has a 2021 impact factor of 10.53. Its scopus rank is 1 in Filtration and separation category and 19 in biochemistry category. Among ranking it 8th out of 135 journals in the category "Engineering, Chemical" and 10th out of 79 journals in the category "Polymer Science".
