= Caddisfly silk =

Silk secreted by the caddisfly

Caddisfly silk is silk that is secreted by the silk glands of the caddisfly (Trichoptera), similar to Lepidoptera silkworms (B. mori). The larvae use silk to hunt and defend themselves. The silk's underwater binding properties are a subject of ongoing scientific research.

== Caddisfly silk (fibroin) ==
Trichoptera, or caddisfly, larvae use silk to hunt and protect themselves in their aquatic environment. Much like silkworms and other Lepidoptera, this silk protein is excreted by specialized silk glands. The silk’s structure is mostly conserved among many different caddisfly species, and can be used to bind debris including rocks, sticks, twigs and shells, as well as to build nets for catching prey. Caddisflies, which spend the majority of their life cycle in the larval stage, need these casings to protect their underbellies and pupate. Caddisfly silk is very strong and durable. Because their silk must be able to bind to a variety of components while completely submerged in water, it is therefore being studied for potential applications as a waterproof adhesive.

=== Protein structure ===
Caddisfly silk is a heterodimer of heavy and light fibroin proteins with approximately 450 and 250 amino acid residues, respectively. Similar to Lepidoptera, Trichoptera H and L fibroin also exhibit conserved cysteine residues needed for disulfide linkage of the two proteins. Unlike the fibroin dimer of Lepidoptera, Trichoptera dimers are not escorted by a P25 protein, which is likely unnecessary due to the increased hydrophilicity of trichopteran fibroin. Trichoptera H-fibroin contains repeated β-sheet motifs similar to those found in Lepidoptera fibroin, characterized by the highly conserved proline–glycine turn found within a repeating sequence in the protein and by the highly crystalline structure found within trichopteran silk fibers. However, where the fibroin of silkworms contains β-sheets rich in glycine and alanine, the β-sheet motif of trichopteran fibroin contains a significantly different amino acid makeup. The β-sheet motif of caddisfly H-fibroin was found to have a (SX)4 repeating pattern, meaning serine alternating with usually isoleucine or valine. Throughout the H-fibroin protein, greater than 60% of all serines were phosphorylated. Though negative charges are generally considered a destabilizer of β-sheets, their consistent appearance within the β motif suggests a potentially novel structure. This negatively charged group suggests that ionic interactions, rather than hydrogen bonding, may explain the unusual strength of caddisfly silk. Phosphorylated serines have been found in other underwater bioadhesives, including in molluscs and sea cucumbers.

=== Ionic interactions ===
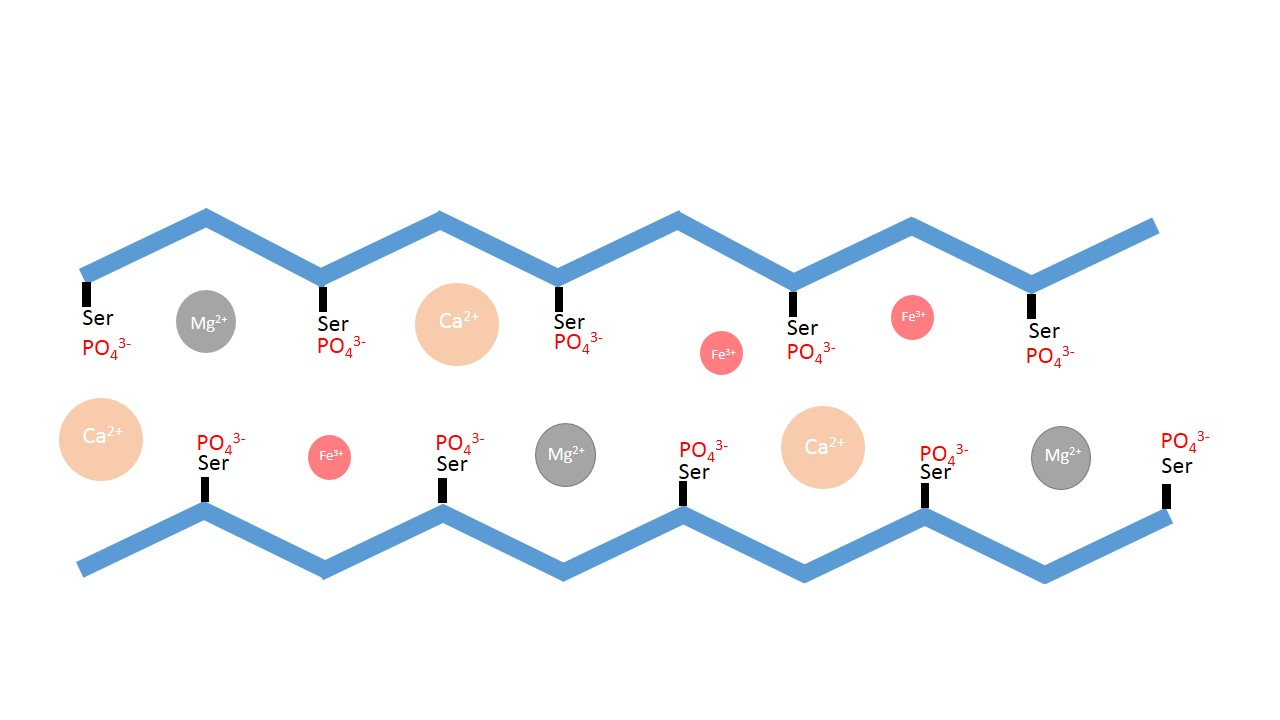
This diagram depicts the ionic interactions between negatively charged amino acids and cations in freshwater caddisfly larvae silk

The heavily phosphorylated β-sheet of caddisfly larvae contains strong negative charges which have been found to interact with di- and trivalent cations found naturally within the larvae's aquatic environment. These cations, including calcium, magnesium, and iron, are vital to maintaining the rigid structure of the silk's β-sheet. The ionic interactions between negatively charged serines and these cations produce a crystal with a unit cell of 5.9 Angstroms x 23.3 Angstroms x 17.3 Angstroms, as determined by X-Ray diffraction. The necessity of these cations was shown using EDTA to chelate and remove them from the protein structure, producing a mobile, noncrystalline protein. Reintroduction of monovalent ions failed to restore the crystalline structure, however reintroduction of calcium or other multivalent ions successfully restored the rigidity to the H-fibroin protein.
