= Frank S. Bates =

American chemical engineer and materials scientist

Regents Professor Frank S. Bates
- Born: 1954 (age 71–72); U.S.
- Education: State University of New York, Albany; Massachusetts Institute of Technology
- Known for: Block Copolymers; Neutron Scattering; Polymer Blends; Microemulsions; Polymer Phase Behavior
- Awards: John H. Dillon Medal, 1989; Polymer Physics Prize, APS 1997; National Academy of Engineering (2002); American Academy of Arts and Sciences (2010); National Academy of Sciences (2017); National Academy of Inventors (2018)
- Scientific career
- Fields: Chemical engineering, materials science
- Workplaces: Bell Labs; University of Minnesota
- Doctoral advisor: Robert E. Cohen

External videos
- “Professor Frank S. Bates, Dep. of Chemical Eng. and Materials Science, University of Minnesota” “CEMS UMN - Frank Bates CHATS Lecture: Polymers”

Frank Steven Bates (born 1954, New York, New York) is an American chemical engineer and materials scientist. Bates is a Regent's Professor (2007–present), a Distinguished McKnight University Professor (1996–present), and department head (1999–2014) in the department of chemical engineering and materials science at the University of Minnesota, where he has been a faculty member since 1989. Prior to his appointment at the University of Minnesota, Bates was a member of the technical staff at AT&T Bell Laboratories from 1982 to 1989.

He is well-recognized for his wide-ranging research in polymer science, especially, his contributions to the fundamental understanding of the phase behavior of polymer blends and to the physics of microphase separated block copolymers. According to Web of Science, he has produced over 400 published works that have been cited over 36,000 times with an h-index of 97 as of February 15, 2018. He was elected to the National Academy of Engineering in 2002, the American Academy of Arts and Sciences in 2010, and National Academy of Sciences in 2017.

== Early life and education ==
Frank S. Bates was born on April 10, 1954, in New York, New York. He received his bachelor's degree in mathematics at the State University of New York–Albany in 1976. Working under the supervision of Robert E. Cohen at MIT, Bates received his S.M. in chemical engineering in 1979 and his Sc.D. in chemical engineering in 1982. His dissertation was titled "An Investigation of Structure and Properties in a Model Set of Diblock Copolymer–Homopolymer Blends." Bates subsequently joined the technical staff at AT&T Bell Laboratories. Bates and his wife, Janis, have three children.

== Contributions to polymer science ==
Bates is internationally recognized for his outstanding contributions and achievements as a polymer scientist. In a seminal paper published in Physical Review Letters in 1985, Bates demonstrated that isotopically labeled polymers (e.g., perdeuterated poly(1,4-butadiene)) could macrophase separate from their unlabeled counterparts and that these polymer blends exhibit upper critical solution behavior. This work impacted future studies of polymer blend phase behavior using neutron scattering, and it helped to establish Bates' reputation as an expert in the use of neutron scattering the study of soft materials science.

Bates' research in polymer science focuses primarily on the self-assembly of block copolymers into ordered nanoscale morphologies, the dynamics of block copolymers and polymer blends, and the useful bulk physical properties of these materials. One of his most significant contributions in experimental polymer physics is a comprehensive understanding of the thermodynamically driven microphase separation of diblock copolymers with quantitative comparisons to theories developed by Ludwik Leibler and others. This work has had impact on the design of commercial multiblock copolymers for widespread applications. Bates is also credited with supplying a detailed understanding of the formation of bicontinuous and tricontinuous network phase morphologies in block copolymers, including the conclusive identification of the double gyroid morphology in diblock copolymers and the discovery of the first two orthorhombic network phases in soft materials. Bates has also furnished deep insights into the role of thermodynamic fluctuations in copolymer melts, culminating recently in the discovery of block copolymers that form the Frank-Kasper sigma-phase and a dodecagonal quasicrystal.

As a chemical engineer, Bates has translated insights from his fundamental research into the invention and development of commercially useful materials. In collaboration with the Dow Chemical Company, he helped develop multiblock copolymers based on hydrogenated polystyrene (also known as poly(cyclohexylethylene) or poly(vinylcyclohexane)) for applications such as compact discs, DVDs, and optical display films. The American Chemical Society recognized this productive partnership between academic and industrial scientists with the 2008 ACS Cooperative Research Award. Together, Dow and the Bates laboratory have also developed a class of cost-effective block copolymers for toughening certain epoxy resins, which commonly used in microelectronics circuit boards, as well as new excipients for solubilizing otherwise intractable therapeutics for oral drug delivery.

== Awards, honors, and professional service ==
For his outstanding research and education efforts, Bates has received numerous awards including:

- 1989 John H. Dillon Medal from the American Physical Society
- 1997 Polymer Physics Prize from the American Physical Society
- 2004 David Turnbull Lectureship Award from the Materials Research Society
- 2008 American Chemical Society Cooperative Research Award from the Division of Polymeric Materials Science & Engineering
- 2008 Sustained Research Prize from the Neutron Scattering Society of America
- 2012 Institute Lecturer of the American Institute of Chemical Engineers.
- 2014 Cozzarelli Prize, Applied Science and Engineering, PNAS

In 2002, Bates was elected as a member into the National Academy of Engineering for important contributions on the phase behavior of polymer blends, particularly block co-polymers. He is also a fellow of the American Physical Society (1992), the American Association for the Advancement of Science (2005), the American Academy of Arts & Sciences (2010), the National Academy of Sciences (2017), and the National Academy of Inventors (2018).

Bates is also known for his expertise and advocacy for neutron scattering science facilities in the U.S., evidenced by service as the chair of the National Committee for an Advanced Neutron Source (1990–1995), president of the Neutron Scattering Society of America (1996–1999), and as a member of the advisory committee for the Center for Nanophase Materials Science at Oak Ridge National Laboratory.

He has served the broader scientific community as a former divisional associate editor for Physical Review Letters (1994–1999) and a member of the reviewing board of editors of Science (1997–2002).

During his tenure as department head (1999–2014) in chemical engineering and materials science at the University of Minnesota, Bates has led multiple fundraising initiatives. In 2006, he initiated an ambitious and successful campaign to raise $20 million to endow first-year graduate fellowships in his department. More recently, Bates garnered a $5 million contribution from the Dow Chemical Company and a $10 million contribution from Robert Gore and Jane Gore (the inventor of a fabric known as Gore-Tex) as matching funds toward the construction of a 40,000 square-foot research facility known as the Gore Annex to Amundson Hall.

== Works ==
Frank Bates has authored numerous journal articles describing significant advances in polymer science, materials science, and chemical engineering which includes but is not limited to:

- F.S. Bates, G.D. Wignall, W.C. Koehler "Critical Behavior of Binary Liquid Mixtures of Deuterated and Protonated Polymers", Physical Review Letters 55, 2425 (1985).
- F.S. Bates "Measurement of the Correlation Hole in Homogeneous Block Copolymer Melts", Macromolecules 18, 525 (1985).
- G.D.T. Wignall, F.S. Bates, "Absolute calibration of small-angle neutron scattering data", Journal of Applied Crystallography 20, 28 (1987).
- F.S. Bates "Polymer-polymer phase behavior", Science 251, 898 (1991).
- A.K. Khandpur, S. Foerster, F.S. Bates, I.W. Hamley, A.J. Ryan, W. Bras, K. Almdal, K. Mortenson "Polyisoprene-Polystyrene Diblock Copolymer Phase Diagram near the Order-Disorder Transition", Macromolecules 28, 8796 (1995).
- J.H. Rosedale, F.S. Bates, K. Almdal, K. Mortensen, G.D. Wignall "Order and Disorder in Symmetric Diblock Polymer Melts", Macromolecules 28, 1429 (1995).
- M.W. Matsen, F.S. Bates "Unifying weak- and strong-segregation block copolymer theories", Macromolecules 29, 1091 (1996).
- F.S. Bates, W.M. Maurer, P.M. Lipic, M.A. Hillmyer, K. Almdal, K. Mortensen, G.H. Fredrickson, T.P. Lodge "Polymeric Bicontinuous Microemulsions", Physical Review Letters 79, 849 (1997).
- Y.Y. Won, H.Ted Davis, F.S. Bates, "Giant Wormlike Rubber Micelles", Science 283, 960 (1999).
- F.S. Bates, G.H. Fredrickson, D. Hucul, S.F. Hahn "PCHE-based Pentablock Copolymers: Evolution of a New Plastic", AIChE Journal 47, 762 (2001).
- J.M. Dean, N.E. Verghese, H.Q. Pham, F.S. Bates "Nanostructure Toughened Epoxy Resins", Macromolecules 36, 9267-9270 (2003).
- S. Jain, F.S. Bates, "On the origins of morphological complexity in block copolymer surfactants", Science 300, 460 (2003).
- T.H. Epps, E.W. Cochran, C.M. Hardy, T.S. Baily, R.S. Waletzko, F.S. Bates "Network Phases in ABC Triblock Polymers", Macromolecules 37, 7085 (2004).
- S. Lee, C. Leighton, F.S. Bates, "Sphericity and Symmetry Breaking in the Formation of Frank-Kasper Phases From One Component Materials", Proceedings of the National Academy of Sciences 111, 17723, (2014).

Impactful Reviews and Perspectives

- F.S. Bates, G.H. Fredrickson, "Block Copolymer Thermodynamics: Theory and Experiment", Annual Review of Physical Chemistry 41, 525, (1990).
- G.H. Fredrickson, F.S. Bates, "Dynamics of block copolymers: theory and experiment", Annual Review of Materials Science 26, 1 (1996).
- F.S. Bates, G.H. Fredrickson, "Block copolymers-designer soft materials", Physics Today 52, 32, (1999).
- F.S. Bates, M.A. Hillmyer, T.P. Lodge, C.M. Bates, K.T. Delaney, G.H. Fredrickson, "Multiblock polymers: panacea or Pandora's box?", Science 336, 434 (2012).
