= Stephen Z. D. Cheng =

American chemist

Stephen Z. D. Cheng (born 1949 in Shanghai) is a Chinese-American polymer scientist and chemical engineer. Cheng is the R.C.Musson & Trustees Professor of Polymer Science, and was the former Dean of the College of Polymer Science & Polymer Engineering at the University of Akron.

== Early life and education ==
Cheng received his bachelor's degree in mathematics from the East China Normal University in Shanghai in 1977. Cheng received his MSc in polymer science & engineering from the Donghua University also in Shanghai in 1981. Cheng further pursued his study in the United States. He became a graduate student at the Rensselaer Polytechnic Institute in 1981, and obtained his PhD degree in polymer chemistry in May 1985.

== Research and career ==
Cheng became a faculty as an assistant professor of polymer science at the University of Akron in October 1987. He was promoted to associate professor with tenure in 1991, and further the professor of polymer science in 1995. Cheng became the Trustees Professor of Polymer Science in September 1998, and the Robert C. Musson Professor of Polymer Science in 2001, all at the University of Akron. From 2001 to 2005, Cheng was the Chairman of the Department of Polymer Science at the University of Akron, and he was appointed Dean of the College of Polymer Science & Polymer Engineering on August 1, 2007.

Cheng was elected as a member into the National Academy of Engineering in 2008 for the development of materials for liquid crystal displays and the elucidation of structure-property relationships in polymeric materials.

== Honors and awards ==
Cheng has been awarded,

- The Presidential Young Investigator Award, by the White House and the National Science Foundation (NSF), 1991
- The American Chemical Society (ACS) Akron Section Award, 1994
- The John H. Dillon Medal, from the American Physical Society (APS), 1995
- The Mettler-Toledo Award, from the North American Thermal Analysis Society, 1999
- The TA-Instrument Award, from the International Confederation for Thermal Analysis and Calorimetry, 2004
- The Cooperative Research Award, from the ACS, 2005
- The Polymer Physics Prize, the American Physical Society 2013

Cheng was elected Fellow of the American Association for the Advancement of Science in 2006, Fellow of the American Physical Society in 1994, Fellow of the North American Thermal Analysis Society in 1992, Fellow of the American Chemical Society in 2012. In 2008, Cheng was elected Member of the United States National Academy of Engineering and 2011 he was elected Member of the National Academy of Inventors.
