= ACS Macro Letters =

- Discipline: Polymer Science, Nanoscience, Supramolecular Chemistry
- Language: English
- Edited by: Stuart J. Rowan

Publication details
- History: 2012-present
- Publisher: American Chemical Society (United States)
- Frequency: Monthly
- Impact factor: 5.8 (2022)

Standard abbreviations
- ISO 4: ACS Macro Lett.

Indexing
- ISSN: 2161-1653

Links
- Journal homepage

ACS Macro Letters is a peer-reviewed scientific journal published by the American Chemical Society. As of 2017, ACS Macro Letters has the highest impact factor of any journal in the field of polymer science (6.131). With the launch of ACS Macro Letters, all Communications to the Editor that were formerly published in Macromolecules will be published as Letters in ACS Macro Letters. Researchers are advised turn to ACS Macro Letters for reports of early, urgent results in polymer science and to Macromolecules for more detailed discussions of comprehensive research findings.

== Scope ==
Examining both synthetic and naturally occurring polymers, ACS Macro Letters reports major advances in polymer synthesis, modification reactions, characteristics, theory, simulation, surface properties, and kinetics and mechanisms. The journal reports on all areas of soft matter science where macromolecules play a key role, including nanotechnology, self-assembly, supramolecular chemistry, biomaterials, energy, and sustainable materials.

== Readership ==
ACS Macro Letters is intended for researchers in polymer science as well as materials science, nanotechnology, pharmaceuticals, and energy. The journal makes it possible for these researchers to stay abreast of the most urgent research results in polymer science and its related disciplines.

== Editor-in-Chief ==
Timothy P. Lodge served as the Founding Editor-in-Chief of ACS Macro Letters (2011–2017). In 2018, Lodge was succeeded by Stuart J. Rowan, who was formerly the Deputy Editor.

== See also ==
- Biomacromolecules
- Macromolecules
