= Benjamin Chu =

American chemist

- Born: March 3, 1932 (age 94)
- Awards: Guggenheim Fellowship; Sloan Fellowship

Academic background
- Education: St. Norbert College (BS); Cornell University (MS, PhD)

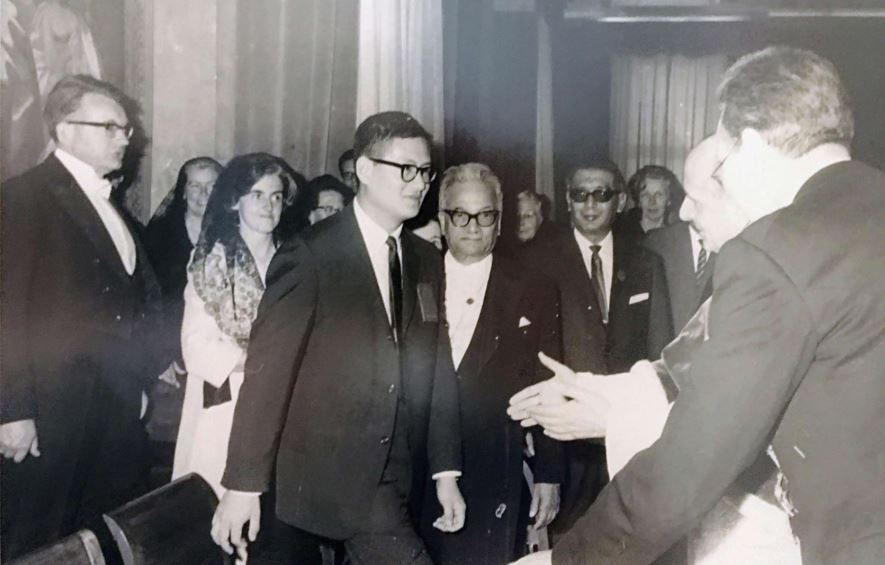
Chu received by Pope Paul VI during a 1966 Study Week on Molecular Forces

Benjamin Thomas Chu (born March 3, 1932) is a Chinese-born American chemist. He is a Distinguished Professor Emeritus of Research at Stony Brook University.

== Education ==
Chu received his secondary education at schools in Shanghai and Hong Kong. He moved to the United States in 1953 to attended St. Norbert College on scholarship. Chu earned a doctorate in radiochemistry from Cornell University in 1959,

== Career ==
Chu started work as a research associate of Peter Debye. He began his teaching career at the University of Kansas in 1962. Chu joined the State University of New York at Stony Brook faculty in 1968. He was awarded a Sloan Fellowship for 1966-68 and a Guggenheim Fellowship for 1968-69. Chu was named a leading professor of chemistry in 1988, and appointed to a distinguished professorship in 1992. Chu has received the Humboldt Research Award twice, in 1976 and 1992, and was elected fellow of the American Physical Society in 1992.

== Selected fellowships and honors ==
- Participant of the 1966 Study Week on Molecular Forces, Pontifical Academy of Science, Vatican City, Rome, Italy
- Alfred P. Sloan Fellowship, 1966–68
- John Simon Guggenheim Fellowship, 1968–69
- Visiting Professor/Fellow, Japan Society for the Promotion of Science, 1975–76, 1992–93
- Humboldt Award, 1976–77, 1992-93
- Distinguished Achievement Award in Natural Science, St. Norbert College, 1981
- Fellow, American Institute of Chemists; Fellow, American Physical Society;
- Honorary Professor of the Chinese Academy of Sciences, 1992 -
- High Polymer Physics Prize, American Physical Society, 1993
- Langmuir Distinguished Lecturer, Colloid and Surface Chemistry Division, American Chemical Society, 1994
- Honorary Professor, Nankai University, Tianjin, China 1996-
- Award for Distinguished Service in Advancement of Polymer Science, Society of Polymer Science, Japan, 1997
- Honorary Professor, Xiamen University, Xiamen, China 1998-
- 1998 Achievement Award of Chinese Institute of Engineers/USA, Outstanding Achievement Award 1998
- Honorary Professor, Wuhan University, Wuhan, China 2004-
- Distinguished Honor Professor, Changchun Institute of Applied Chemistry, Chinese Academy of Sciences, Changchun, China 2006-
- Honorary Professor, Beijing University of Science and Technology, Beijing, China 2006-
- Gutenberg Lecture Award, Johannes Gutenberg University, Mainz, Germany 2007
- 2007 St. Norbert College, De Pere, Wisconsin for Honorary Doctor of Law degree
- Honorary Member of the Society of Polymer Science, Japan 2008

== Selected books ==
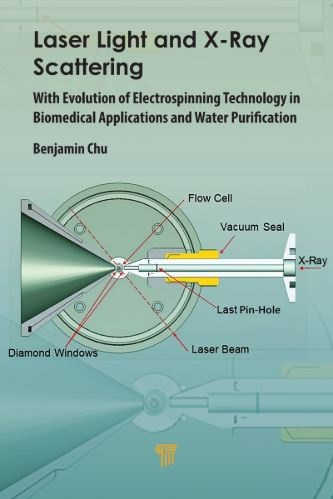
Laser Light and X-Ray Scattering Book cover

- Laser Light and Synchrotron X-Ray Scattering: With Evolution of Electrospinning Technology in Biomedical and Water Purification. (2025) ISBN 9789814968881
- "Molecular Forces Based on the Baker Lectures of Peter J. W. Debye," John Wiley and Sons, Inc., New York (1967) 176 pp.
- "Problems in Chemical Thermodynamics," Addison- Wesley Publishing Co., Inc., Reading, Massachusetts (1967) 240 pp.
- "Laser Light Scattering," Academic Press, New York and London (1974) 337 pp.
- NATO ASI, Series B: Physics, Volume 73. "Proceedings on Scattering Techniques Applied to Supramolecular and Nonequilibrium Systems, edited by S. H. Chen, B. Chu and R. Nossal, Plenum Press (1981) 928 pp.
- SPIE Milestone Series. Vol. MS 12, "Selected Papers on Laser Light Scattering by Macromolecular, Supramolecular and Fluid Systems, edited by B. Chu (1990) 736 pp.
- "Laser Light Scattering: Basic Principles and Practice," 2nd Edition, Academic Press, Boston, (1991) 343 pp. Reprinted with new Preface by Dover Publications, Inc., Mineola, NY (2007) 368pp.
