= Lloyd Noel Ferguson =

American chemist

- Born: February 9, 1918; Oakland, California, United States
- Died: November 30, 2011 (aged 93)

Lloyd Noel Ferguson (February 9, 1918 – November 30, 2011) was an American chemist.

== Early life ==
As a child in Oakland, California, Ferguson had a backyard laboratory in which he developed a moth repellent, a silverware cleanser, and a lemonade powder. He graduated from Oakland Technical High School in 1934, at the age of 16. After working in construction and as a railway porter in order to earn enough money to pay for college, he did his undergraduate studies at the University of California, Berkeley and received a Ph.D. from the same university in 1943, the first African American to earn a chemistry Ph.D. there. During his time at Berkeley, Ferguson worked with Melvin Calvin on the synthesis of Schiff base ligands used to form transition metal complexes that mimic the oxygen-carrying ability of biological proteins.

== Career ==
After receiving his Ph.D., he took a faculty position at North Carolina Agricultural and Technical College, then approximately two years later moved to Howard University, where he became the chair of his department and founded a doctoral program there, the first in chemistry at any black college. Ferguson was also elected to the American Chemical Society in 1952. While affiliated with Howard University, he received a Guggenheim Fellowship in 1953 and an NSF grant in 1960 that allowed him to travel to the Carlsberg Laboratory in Copenhagen, Denmark, and to ETH Zurich in Switzerland. He moved to the California State University, Los Angeles in 1965. He again became chair, and played an advisory role to the Food and Drug Administration. He retired in 1986.

Ferguson is the author of seven chemistry textbooks and more than 50 research papers. His research ranged widely through his career but largely centered around organic chemistry and chemoreceptors. Beginning with Ferguson's 1958 paper in the Journal of Chemical Education, he developed a large body of knowledge around taste as it relates to the structure of organic compounds. This research eventually led to several papers on the structure–taste relationship of sweetness which put forth that compounds must have both a hydrogen bond donor and a large hydrophobic core for sweetness to be detected biochemically. In the arena of chemosensing, Ferguson also published on carcinogens and chemotherapy, helping to summarize many of the mechanisms for chemical carcinogenesis and methods for determining structure-function relationships in anticancer agents.

In 1972, Ferguson was one of the founders of the National Organization for the Professional Advancement of Black Chemists and Chemical Engineers. In his honor, the organization gives its Lloyd N. Ferguson Young Scientist Award to young scientists with "technical excellence and documented contributions to their field".

As the chair of the American Chemical Society's Division of Chemical Education, Ferguson helped form the Project SEED program in 1968, which connects economically disadvantaged high school students in the United States to research and internship opportunities in chemistry at academic institutions, government laboratories, and companies.

Ferguson received A Outstanding Professor Award from the California State University system in 1979–1980. In 1995, the chemistry department at Cal. State L.A. established the annual Lloyd Ferguson Distinguished Lecture series, in Ferguson's honor. Cal. State L.A. also has a schoalrship named after Ferguson for all the contributions and barriers he broke while studying and working their.
