= Michael Rubner =

American engineer

Michael Rubner is an American engineer and currently the TDK Professor of Polymer Materials Science and Engineering at Massachusetts Institute of Technology.
