= Society of Polymer Science =

Japanese non-profit organization

The Society of Polymer Science is a Japanese non-profit organization that studies polymer science with a focus on Japan but also internationally. The Society of Polymer Science was established in 1951 and currently has about 12,000 members. The society issues a monthly academic journal, the Polymer Journal.
