= Polymer Journal =

- Discipline: polymer science
- Language: English
- Edited by: Keiji Tanaka

Publication details
- History: 1970 to present
- Publisher: Nature Publishing Group (United Kingdom)
- Frequency: monthly
- Impact factor: 3.08 (2020)

Standard abbreviations
- ISO 4: Polym. J.

Indexing
- ISSN: 0032-3896 (print); 1349-0540 (web)

Links
- Journal homepage; SPSJ site of the journal

Polymer Journal is the official journal of the Society of Polymer Science, Japan (SPSJ) and publishes original articles, notes, short communications and reviews on developments in macromolecule research. It is an international peer-reviewed journal that is published on a monthly basis. The current Editor-in-Chief is Keiji Tanaka of Kyushu University, Japan.
