= Macromolecules (journal) =

- Discipline: Macromolecular science
- Language: English
- Edited by: Marc A. Hillmyer

Publication details
- History: 1968–present
- Publisher: American Chemical Society (United States)
- Frequency: Biweekly
- Impact factor: 6.057 (2021)

Standard abbreviations
- ISO 4: Macromolecules

Indexing
- CODEN: MAMOBX
- ISSN: 0024-9297 (print); 1520-5835 (web)
- OCLC no.: 802629926

Links
- Journal homepage; Online access; Online archive

Macromolecules is a peer-reviewed scientific journal that has been published since 1968 by the American Chemical Society. Initially published bimonthly, it became monthly in 1983 and then, in 1990, biweekly. Macromolecules is abstracted and indexed in Scopus, EBSCOhost, PubMed, Web of Science, and SwetsWise. The editor-in-chief is Marc A. Hillmyer. Its first editor was Dr. Field H. Winslow.

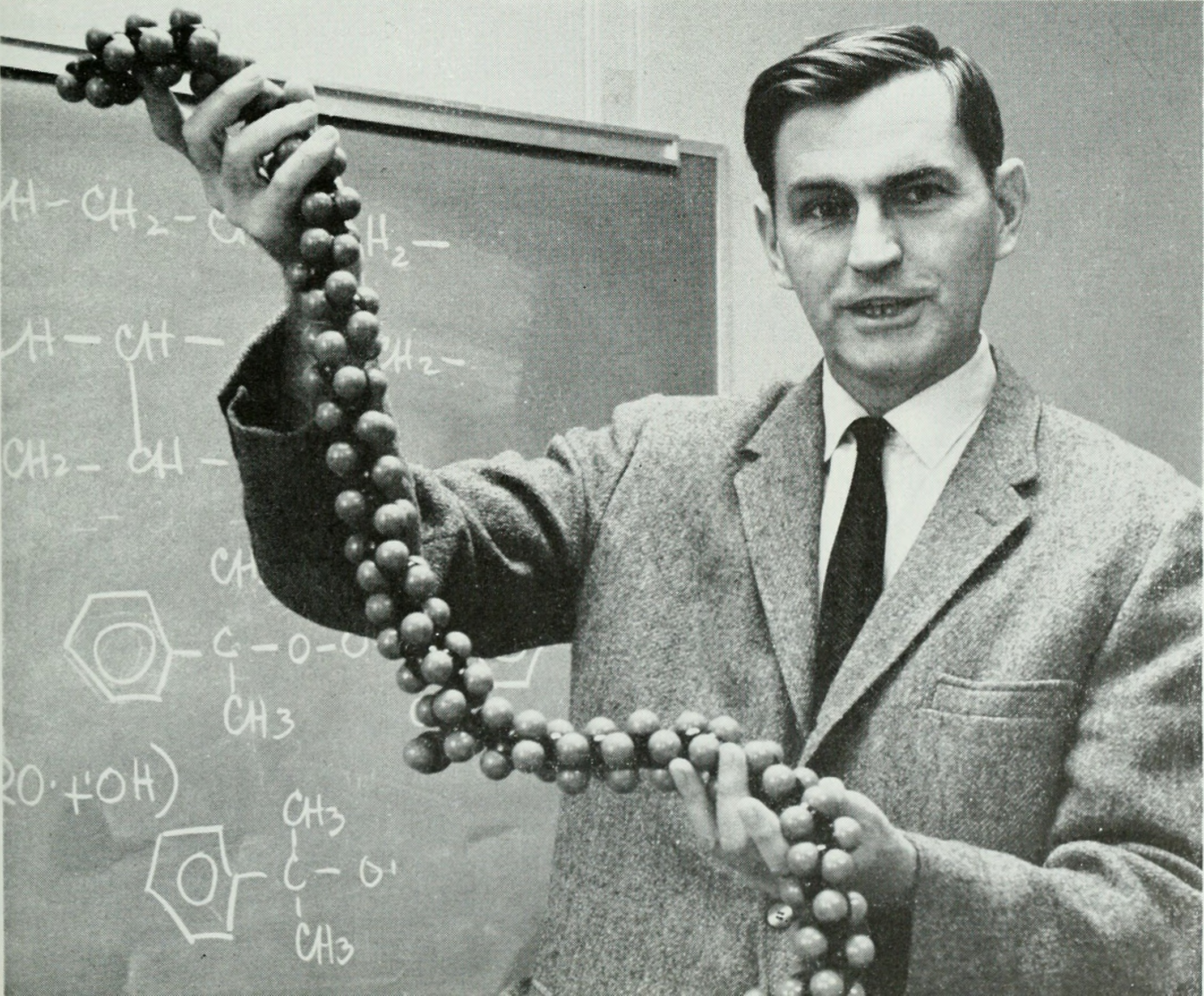
First editor of Macromolecules, Dr. Field H. Winslow
