= Ira A. Fulton Schools of Engineering =

Engineering college of Arizona State University

Coordinates: 33.4235°N 111.9396°W

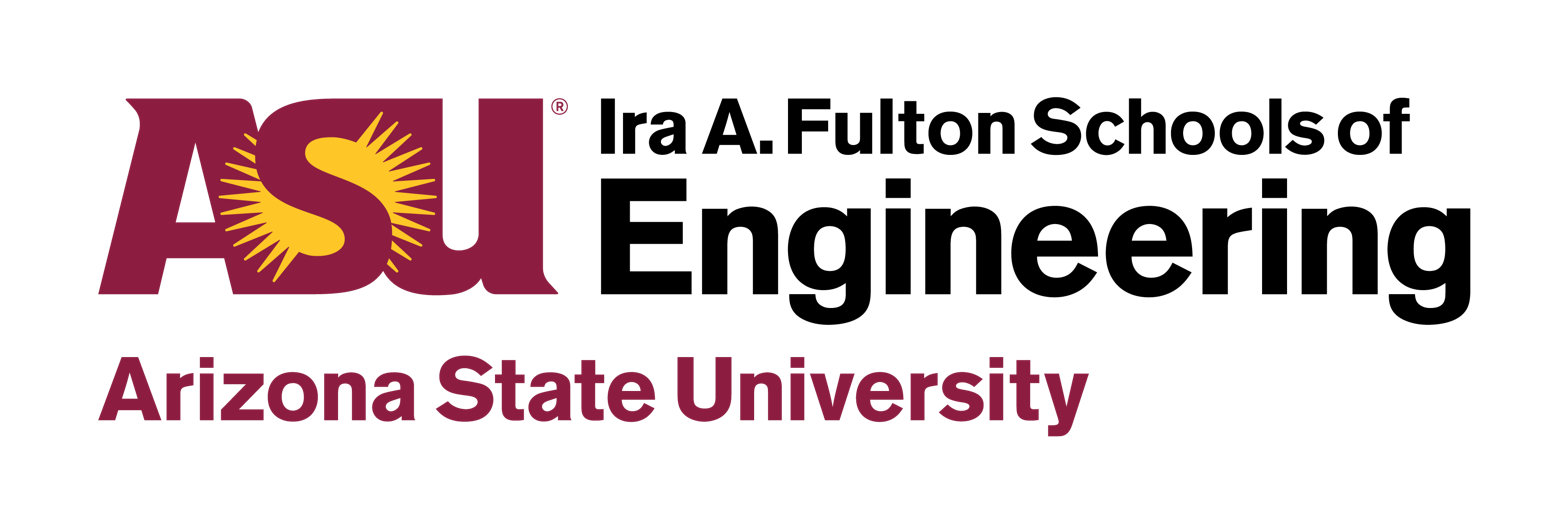
- Established: 1954 (as ASU College of Engineering and Applied Sciences)
- Dean: Kyle Squires
- Faculty: 408 Tenured/tenure-track
- Students: 32,378 (Fall 2025)
- Location: Tempe, Arizona, Mesa, Arizona and Phoenix, Arizona, U.S.
- Campus: Arizona State University - Tempe, Arizona State University - Polytechnic campus (Mesa, AZ) and Arizona State University West Valley campus
- Website: engineering.asu.edu

The Ira A. Fulton Schools of Engineering (often abbreviated to the Fulton Schools) is the engineering college of Arizona State University. The Fulton Schools offers 27 undergraduate and more than 50 graduate degree programs in all major engineering disciplines, construction, computer science and several engineering technology degrees. In 2023 the Fulton Schools became the first university in the nation to offer a bachelor's degree, master's degree and doctoral degree in manufacturing engineering.

The Fulton Schools comprises eight engineering schools located on ASU's Tempe, Polytechnic and West Valley campuses. The eight schools include the following:

- School of Biological and Health Systems Engineering
- School of Computing and Augmented Intelligence
- School of Electrical, Computer and Energy Engineering
- School for Engineering of Matter, Transport and Energy
- School of Integrated Engineering (West Valley campus)
- School of Manufacturing Systems and Networks (Polytechnic campus)
- School of Sustainable Engineering and the Built Environment
- The Polytechnic School (Polytechnic campus)

The Fulton Schools also collaborate with international universities, government organizations, and international subject matter experts. These partnerships are part of their global engagement plan, and support access to engineering education, research initiatives, and community development projects in Arizona and internationally.

== History ==
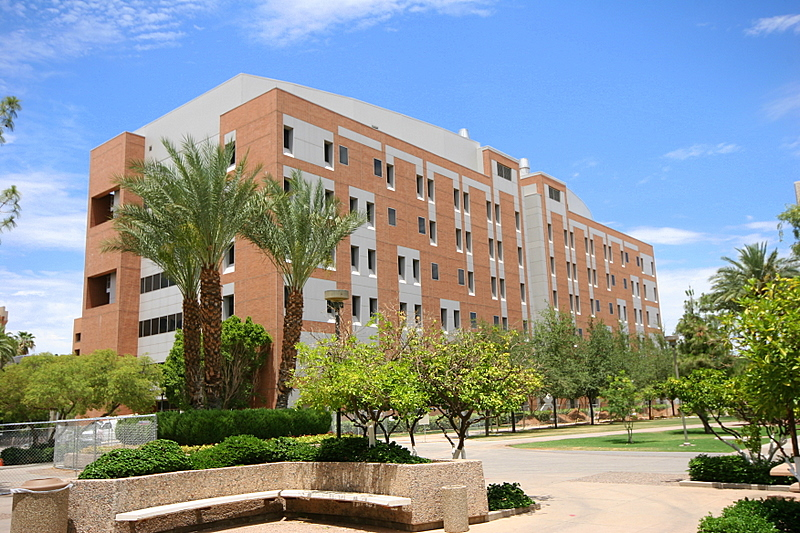
Goldwater Engineering Research Building; one of several buildings used by Fulton Schools

The Ira A. Fulton Schools of Engineering began in 1954 as the College of Applied Arts and Sciences. In 1956, the first bachelor's degree program in engineering was approved. The School of Engineering was created in 1958. In 1970, the Division of Construction was added.

In 1992, through a gift of the Del E. Webb Foundation, an endowment was set up to create the Del E. Webb School of Construction, which offers undergraduate and graduate construction and construction management programs. It is now a part of the School of Sustainable Engineering and the Built Environment. A separate school was created for technology programs and, in 1996, the Schools of Technology and Agribusiness moved to the Polytechnic Campus.

In 2002, the Department of Bioengineering was renamed the Harrington Department of Bioengineering in honor of a $5 million gift from the Harrington Arthritis Research Center. The department is now one of the eight Fulton Schools, the School of Biological and Health Systems Engineering.

Also in 2002, the office of Global Outreach and Executive Education (GOEE) was established to provide anytime/anyplace learning environments for industry professionals to complete advanced degrees. In 2003, the program began offering engineering graduate degrees completely online. Currently, GOEE offers 16 online undergraduate engineering/technology degree programs, 17 online master's degree programs, and one online master's program for students in China. GOEE also offers three graduate-level academic certificate programs.

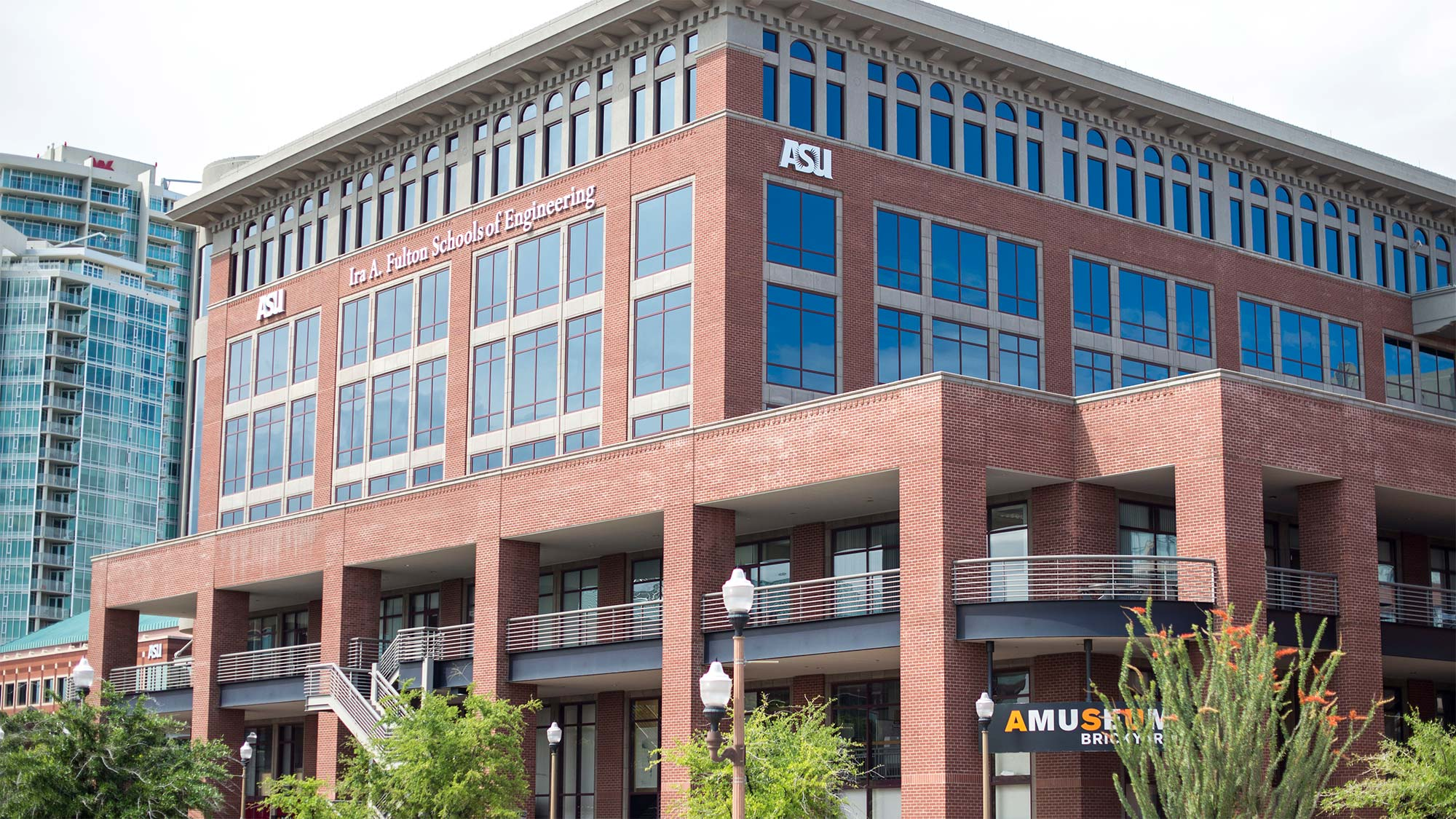
The Brickyard building, home of the administrative offices of the Ira A. Fulton Schools of Engineering and one of its schools, the School of Computing and Augmented Intelligence.

In 2003, Ira A. Fulton, founder and CEO of Fulton Homes, established an endowment of $50 million in support of ASU's College of Engineering and Applied Sciences, which was renamed in his honor. The new Ira A. Fulton Schools of Engineering was reconstructed to include five separate and interdisciplinary schools: The School of Biological and Health Systems Engineering; the School of Computing, Informatics and Decision Systems Engineering; the School of Electrical, Computer and Energy Engineering; the School for Engineering of Matter, Transport and Energy; and the School of Sustainable Engineering and the Built Environment.

Since receiving this transformational gift, the Ira A. Fulton Schools of Engineering have grown in enrollment, programs offered and research expenditures. Between 2015 and 2019, research expenditures rose from $89 million to $115 million.

In 2014, the College of Technology and Innovation on ASU's Polytechnic campus was renamed The Polytechnic School and became the sixth school in the Fulton Schools.

In August 2021, the Ira A. Fulton Schools of Engineering introduced the seventh Fulton School, the School of Manufacturing Systems and Networks (MSN) on the Polytechnic campus. At the same time, the School of Computing, Informatics, and Decision Systems Engineering was renamed the School of Computing and Augmented Intelligence (SCAI).

Fall 2024 enrollment (21st day census) in the Fulton Schools was 32,709 students total (undergraduate and graduate).

The Fulton Schools employ 408 tenured/tenure-track faculty and have $265 million in research expenditures (FY 2023).

In March of 2023, the Fulton Schools expanded again with the announcement of a new school on the ASU West Valley campus: the School of Integrated Engineering, bringing the number of Fulton Schools to eight.

== Location ==
The Fulton Schools administrative offices and some departments are located within The Brickyard building complex on Mill Avenue in downtown Tempe, Arizona.

The Fulton Schools has more than 1,000,000 square feet of space in over a dozen buildings on ASU's Tempe, Polytechnic and West Valley campuses. Degree programs are offered in-person on the Tempe, Polytechnic (Mesa, Arizona), and West Valley campuses, and online at ASU Online.

In September 2014, The Paul C. Helmick Center (formerly College Avenue Commons) was opened as the new home of the School of Sustainable Engineering and the Built Environment, including the Del E. Webb School of Construction (DEWSC). DEWSC students, faculty and alumni contributed to the design and construction of the building, which features some exposed construction elements which allow it to be used as a teaching tool. Like many ASU and Fulton Schools buildings, it is Leadership in Energy and Environmental Design (LEED) Gold certified.

In August 2017, The Fulton Schools opened Tooker House, a residential community “built for engineers.” Tooker House is a 1,600-person, co-ed residential community for Fulton Schools undergraduate students and features on-site digital classrooms and state-of-the-art makerspaces.

== Notable faculty ==
=== National Academy of Sciences ===
- Alexandra Navrotsky, Professor, School for Engineering of Matter, Transport and Energy

=== National Academy of Engineering ===
- Ronald Adrian - Regents Professor, School for Engineering of Matter, Transport and Energy
- Dimitri Bertsekas - Professor, School of Computing and Augmented Intelligence
- Gerald T. Heydt - Regents Professor, School of Electrical, Computer and Energy Engineering
- Edward Kavazanjian - Regents Professor, School of Sustainable Engineering and the Built Environment
- Subhash Mahajan (emeritus) - Regents Professor, School for Engineering of Matter, Transport and Energy)
- Sethuraman Panchanathan - 2024, Professor, School of Computing and Augmented Intelligence
- Bruce Rittmann - Regents Professor, School of Sustainable Engineering and the Built Environment
- John Undrill - Research Professor, School of Electrical, Computer and Energy Engineering
- Vijay Vittal - Regents Professor, School of Electrical, Computer and Energy Engineering
- Paul Westerhoff - Regents Professor, School of Sustainable Engineering and the Built Environment

=== National Academy of Inventors ===
==== Senior Members ====
- James Abbas - 2020, Associate Professor, Biological and Health Systems Engineering
- David Allee - 2018, Professor, School of Electrical, Computer and Energy
- Terry Alford - 2019, Professor, School for Engineering of Matter, Transport and Energy
- Zhaoyang Fan - 2018, Professor, School of Electrical, Computer and Energy Engineering
- Erica Forzani - 2021, Associate Professor, School for Engineering of Matter, Transport and Energy
- Cody Friesen - Associate Professor, School for Engineering of Matter, Transport and Energy
- Andreas Spanias - 2019, Professor, School of Electrical, Computer and Energy Engineering
- Sarma Vrudhula - 2020, Professor, School of Computing and Augmented Intelligence

==== Fellows ====
- Michael Kozicki - 2014, Professor, School of Electrical, Computer and Energy Engineering
- Deirdre Meldrum - 2017, Distinguished Professor of Biosignatures Discovery, School of Electrical, Computer and Energy Engineering
- Nathan Newman - 2018, Lawrence Professor of Solid State Sciences, School for Engineering of Matter, Transport and Energy
- Sethuraman Panchanathan - 2013, Professor, School of Computing and Augmented Intelligence
- Bruce Rittmann - 2016, Regents Professor, School of Sustainable Engineering and the Built Environment
- Hao Yan - 2022, Associate Professor, School of Computing and Augmented Intelligence
- Klaus Lackner - 2024, Research Professor, School of Sustainable Engineering and the Built Environment

=== Regents Professors ===
The title “Regents Professor” is the highest faculty honor awarded at Arizona State University. It is conferred on ASU faculty who have made pioneering contributions in their areas of expertise, who have achieved a sustained level of distinction, and who enjoy national and international recognition for these accomplishments.

- Ronald Adrian - 2012, School for Engineering of Matter, Transport and Energy
- Constantine A. Balanis - 1991, School of Electrical, Computer and Energy Engineering
- Aditi Chattopadhyay - 2013, Mechanical & Aerospace Engineering
- David K. Ferry - 1988, School of Electrical, Computer and Energy Engineering
- Stephanie Forrest - 2026, School of Computing and Augmented Intelligence
- Gerald T. Heydt - 2002, School of Electrical, Computer and Energy Engineering
- Edward Kavazanjian - 2014, School of Sustainable Engineering and the Built Environment
- Ying-Cheng Lai - 2021, School of Electrical, Computer and Energy Engineering
- Jerry Lin - 2011, School for Engineering of Matter, Transport and Energy
- Huan Liu - 2022, School of Computing and Augmented Intelligence
- Subhash Mahajan - 2006, School for Engineering of Matter, Transport and Energy
- James W. Mayer, 1994, School for Engineering of Matter, Transport and Energy
- Darryl E. Metzger, 1992, School for Engineering of Matter, Transport and Energy
- Douglas Montgomery - 2005, School of Computing and Augmented Intelligence
- Alexandra Navrotsky - 2022, School for Engineering of Matter, Transport and Energy
- Bruce Rittmann - 2008, School of Sustainable Engineering and the Built Environment
- Dieter Schroeder - 2008, School of Electrical, Computer and Energy Engineering
- Vijay Vittal - 2019, School of Electrical, Computer and Energy Engineering
- Paul Westerhoff - 2016, School of Sustainable Engineering and the Built Environment

== Schools ==
- School of Biological and Health Systems Engineering
- School of Computing and Augmented Intelligence (formerly the School of Computing, Informatics, and Decision Systems Engineering)
- School of Electrical, Computer and Energy Engineering
- School for Engineering of Matter, Transport and Energy
- School of Integrated Engineering
- School of Manufacturing Systems and Networks
- School of Sustainable Engineering and the Built Environment
- The Polytechnic School

In addition, The Fulton Schools engage in a globally-connected network of higher education initiatives and collaborations with government entities to provide greater access to engineering education. This set of initiatives is called The Global School.

== Rankings ==
=== U.S. News & World Report Rankings ===
- #32 Undergraduate Program [#18 among public institutions] September 2026
- #41 Graduate Program [#26 among public institutions] April 2026
- #16 Online Master's in Engineering Programs January 2026
- #22 Online Master's in Information Technology Programs January 2026
- #10 Online Master's in Information Technology Programs for Veterans January 2026
- #10 Online Master's in Engineering Programs for Veterans January 2026

=== U.S. News & World Report Graduate School Specialty Rankings ===
Program rankings are from the U.S. News & World Report Graduate School Specialty Rankings 2027 edition, published April 2026, unless otherwise indicated.

Online program rankings are from the U.S. News & World Report Best Online Program Rankings 2027 edition, published January 2026.

- #28 Aerospace
- #56 Bioengineering
- #53 Chemical
- #28 Civil
- #31 Computer Engineering
- #39 Computer Science^{‡} 2026 edition, published April 2025
- #30 Electrical
- #2 Electrical, Online Master's Program, January 2026
- #2 Engineering Management, Online Master's Program, January 2026
- #17 Environmental
- #19 Industrial
- #3 Industrial, Online Master's Program, January 2026
- #43 Materials
- #45 Mechanical

^{‡}According to U.S. News & World Report, the Sciences, including Computer Science, are not ranked every year.

=== Undergraduate Engineering Programs Ranked by U.S. News & World Report for 2026 (for schools with doctorate programs) ===
U.S. News & World Report, 2027 edition, published September 2026

- #20 Aerospace
- #20 Civil
- #21 Computer engineering
- #52 Computer science
- #15 Computer systems (computer science specialty)
- #16 Cybersecurity (computer science specialty)
- #23 Electrical
- #17 Environmental
- #18 Industrial/Manufacturing

=== American Society for Engineering Education (ASEE) Standings ===
==== ASEE Engineering Standings ====
- #4 Bachelor's Degrees Awarded (394 institutions included)
- #6 Master's Degrees awarded to Underrepresented Minorities (394 institutions included)
- #12 Bachelor's Degrees Awarded to Women (394 institutions included)
- #18 Bachelor's Degrees Awarded to African Americans (394 institutions included)
- #7 Bachelor's Degrees Awarded to Hispanics (394 institutions included)
- #3 Highest Graduate Enrollment (top 50 institutions)
- #3 Engineering Master's Degrees Awarded by school (285 institutions included)
- #6 Engineering Master's Degrees Awarded to Underrepresented Minorities (285 institutions included)
- #23 Doctoral Degrees Awarded (198 institutions included)
- #25 Research Expenditures by Institutions (180 institutions included)
- #10 Tenured and Tenure-Track Faculty Members (300 institutions included)
- #7 Female Tenured/Tenure-Track Faculty (300 institutions included)
- #17 Hispanic Tenured/Tenure-Track Faculty (300 institutions included)

==== ASEE Engineering Technology Standings ====
- #1 Engineering Technology Enrollment (131 institutions reported)
- #1 Engineering Technology Degrees awarded (131 institutions reported)
- #1 Engineering Technology Degrees awarded to Women (131 institutions reported)
- #1 Engineering Technology Degrees awarded to Underrepresented Minorities (131 institutions included)
