= Nathan Newman =

Nathan Newman may refer to:

- Nathan Newman (engineer), American engineer and solid-state scientist
- Nathan Newman (writer), British novelist, screenwriter and filmmaker
