= Panchanathan =

Panchanathan is an Indian surname. Notable people with the surname include:

- Magesh Chandran Panchanathan (born 1983), Indian chess grandmaster
- Sethuraman Panchanathan (born 1960/1961), Indian-American computer engineer
