= Thurmon E. Lockhart =

American biomedical engineer

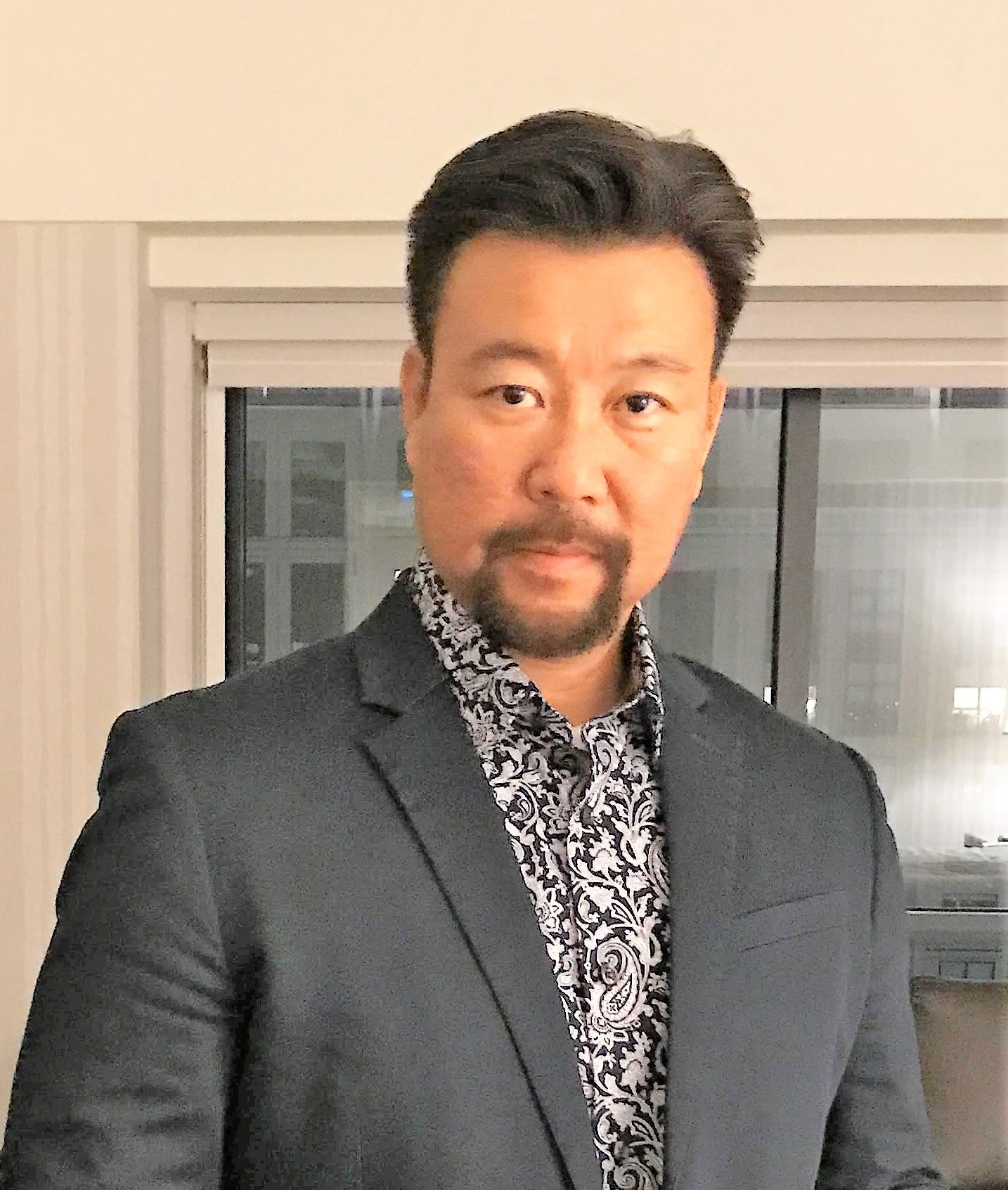
- Occupations: Professor, biomedical engineer, researcher and educator

Academic background
- Education: B.S., Industrial and Systems Engineering; M.S., Industrial and Systems Engineering; Ph.D., Industrial and Systems Engineering
- Alma mater: Texas Tech University

Academic work
- Institutions: Arizona State University

Thurmon E. Lockhart is an American biomedical engineer, researcher and educator. He is the Inaugural MORE Foundation Professor of Life in Motion at Arizona State University, a guest professor at Ghent University in Belgium and, serves as a research affiliate faculty at Mayo Clinic College of Medicine and Science. He is an associate editor of Annals of Biomedical Engineering and academic and guest editor of the Sensors journal He has worked significantly to bring research to practice with various businesses to reduce falls.

Lockhart's work has been focused on the identification and quantification of sensorimotor deficits and movement disorders associated with aging and neurological disorders on fall accidents. He has worked on several projects concerning human locomotion, wearable sensors, gait and posture. He is the author of An Introductions to Statistics for Biomedical Engineering, and has published over 100 papers in scientific journals related to fall prevention. Translating his research, he pioneered a training technique to reduce falls by using the 'Slip Simulator' technology. The system is currently used by various companies to reduce occupational falls.

== Education ==
Lockhart was raised in South Korea. He moved to the United States in 1979. After completing his B.S. in Industrial and Systems Engineering from Texas Tech University in 1992, Lockhart received a M.S. in 1997 and a Ph.D. in 2000, both from Texas Tech University.

== Career ==
Lockhart joined Virginia Tech as an assistant professor in Grado Department of Industrial and Systems Engineering in 2000, becoming associate professor in 2006 and full professor in 2013. He left Virginia Tech in 2014 to join Arizona State University as professor of biomedical engineering in school of biological and health systems engineering and Ira A. Fulton Schools of Engineering.

In 2008, Lockhart was appointed as a guest professor at Ghent University in Ghent, Belgium. In 2014, he joined the Barrow Neurological Institute as an adjunct professor in the department of neurobiology. Lockhart has been a research affiliate professor at college of medicine at Mayo Clinic Arizona since 2017.

From 2010 to 2016, he was the editor for Ergonomics. He has been an associate editor of Annals of Biomedical Engineering since 2010, part of the editorial board of Journal of Biomechanics since 2015 and the guest editor of PLOS Computational Biology, and an Editor of Scientific Reports.

=== Research and work ===
Since the beginning of his career, Lockhart's research has been focused on identification of injury mechanisms and quantification of sensorimotor deficits and movement disorders associated with aging and neurological disorders on fall accidents. Much of his work has focused on improving the lives of older adults and their families.

In the late 1990s, Lockhart studied the biomechanics of slips and falls, how floor surface and visual field obstruction impact falls and how aging affects the likelihood of falls. His research on these topics continued into early 2000s. Some of his research during this time studied how slips and falls differ across different age groups. In early 2000s, he began studying gait and posture, and how the two are connected to slips and falls. This work led to several articles on the topics of gait and posture. In 2003, he wrote a paper entitled 'Effects of age-related gait changes on the biomechanics of slips and falls', modeling the human responses to slips and falls for the first time and pioneering the slip-perturbation method to study fall accidents during walking.

Some of his research during the mid 2000s dealt with the topic of driving: visual characteristics of elderly drivers related to discomfort-glare responses and accommodation processes. In 2001, Lockhart began working with Toyota corporation on a project that lasted four years and resulted in development of international ergonomics standard for Intelligent Transportation System for elderly populations.

In 2003, Lockhart began working with a team of scientists from Sweden to establish worldwide definition of 'mobility' for the elderly leading to the International Standard of Mobility. In the mid 2000s, his research in the area of falls began focusing on fall prevention. Some of his research in the early 2000s and mid 2000s also dealt with how carrying load can affect the likelihood of falling.

Lockhart developed a system that can reduce occupational fall injuries, called the Slip Simulator, which is a training equipment with a 9 foot tall frame and a safety harness. Trainees are made to walk on the simulator. After they are comfortable walking in the simulator, the pathway is made slick with water. The trainee then keeps falling on the surface while trying to walk, being caught by the safety harness. The simulator is based on Lockhart's research that suggests that the only way to train people to avoid falling is to put them in motions of falling or experiencing realistic slips and trips and falls to better understand our limitations in balance maintenance abilities. For their work on Slip Simulator and training systems, Lockhart and his colleagues were awarded the Alexander C. William, Jr. Design Award.

In the early 2010s, Lockhart's research began incorporating the use of advanced computer technology in his studies. He studied the applications of virtual reality for gait training in older adults. He developed a fall risk prediction model that used input from wearable sensors and an automated gait assessment algorithm that used input from inertial sensors. He also studied how mobile phones can be used in predicting and preventing falls. Further work in this area led to the development of Lockhart Monitor, an iOS application for gait and postural stability assessments for fall prone individuals. The application takes data from inertial measurement unit (IMU) on a smartphone, or an IMU worn elsewhere on the patient, to monitor activity over an extended period of time on a smartphone. The applications also takes input from accelerometer and gyroscope located in a smartphone to measure balance ability as well as walking ability.

In the late 2010s, Lockhart began studying mobility and fall risk in patients with Parkinson's disease. His research addresses various neurorehabilitation assessments that are relevant for injury prevention and functional improvements. His work has been expanded to include community dwelling older adults in terms of designing smart homes and smart wearables that could significantly improve mobility in older adults. Some of his research has also studied how obesity can impact the likelihood and risk of falls in both young and old people.

Lockhart has collaborated with several organizations for research and development in the area of fall prevention and occupational safety. He has worked with National Science Foundation, National Institute of Occupational Safety and Health, Office of Naval Research, Los Alamos National Laboratory and Whitaker Foundation. In early 2014, he began a collaboration with ITT, for the development of the new Night-Vision system.

== Awards and honors ==
- 2001 - Special Emphasis Research Career Award (SERCA K01) – CDC/NIH
- 2002 - Faculty Affiliate Research Award, Virginia Tech Center for Gerontology
- 2003 - Dean's Award of Excellence for Outstanding Assistant Professor, Virginia Tech
- 2003 - Biomedical Engineering Grant Investigator – The Whitaker Foundation
- 2005 - Best Paper Award, Liberty Mutual
- 2007 - Disability Research Award, Americans with Disabilities Act
- 2008 - Alexander C. William, Jr., Design Award, HFES Society
- 2008 - Faculty Fellow, college of engineering, Virginia Tech
- 2013 - Dean's Award of Excellence in Research, Virginia Tech

== Publications ==
=== Books ===
- An Introductions to Statistics for Biomedical Engineering. ISBN 978-1-5249-9029-9.

=== Selected articles ===
- Lockhart, T. E.; Woldstad, J. C.; Smith, J. L. (2003). "Effects of age-related gait changes on the biomechanics of slips and falls". Ergonomics. 46 (12): 1136–1160. doi:10.1080/0014013031000139491. PMC 2891178. PMID 12933077.
- Lockhart, T. E.; Smith, J. L.; Woldstad, J. C. (2005). "Effects of Aging on the Biomechanics of Slips and Falls". Human Factors. 47 (4): 708–729. doi:10.1518/001872005775571014. PMC 2895260. PMID 16553061.
- Lockhart, T. E.; Kim, S. (2006). "Relationship between hamstring activation rate and heel contact velocity: Factors influencing age-related slip-induced falls". Gait & Posture. 24 (1): 23–34. doi:10.1016/j.gaitpost.2005.06.016. PMC 2895264. PMID 16112575.
- Lockhart, T. E.; Spaulding, J. M.; Park, S. H. (2007). "Age-related slip avoidance strategy while walking over a known slippery floor surface". Gait & Posture. 26 (1): 142–149. doi:10.1016/j.gaitpost.2006.08.009. PMC 2895267. PMID 17023162.
- Lockhart, TE (2008). "An integrated approach towards identifying age-related mechanisms of slip initiated falls". J Electromyogr Kinesiol. 18 (2): 205–17. doi:10.1016/j.jelekin.2007.06.006. PMC 2349089. PMID 17768070.
- Lockhart, T. E.; Liu, J. (2008). "Differentiating fall-prone and healthy adults using local dynamic stability". Ergonomics. 51 (12): 1860–1872. doi:10.1080/00140130802567079. PMC 2892176. PMID 19034782.
- Granata, K. P.; Lockhart, T. E. (2008). "Dynamic stability differences in fall-prone and healthy adults". Journal of Electromyography and Kinesiology. 18 (2): 172–178. doi:10.1016/j.jelekin.2007.06.008. PMC 2895268. PMID 17686633.
- Lockhart, TE; Barth, AT; Zhang, X; Songra, R; Abdel-Rahman, E; Lach, J (2010). "Portable, non-invasive fall risk assessment in end stage renal disease patients on hemodialysis". Wireless Health 2010. Vol. 2010. pp. 84–93. doi:10.1145/1921081.1921092. ISBN 978-1-60558-989-3.
- Lockhart, T; Kim, S; Kapur, R; Jarrott, S (2009). "Evaluation of gait characteristics and ground reaction forces in cognitively declined older adults with an emphasis on slip-induced falls". Assistive Technology. 21 (4): 188–95. doi:10.1080/10400430903246043. PMC 2894627. PMID 20066885.
- Lockhart, TE; Shi, W (Jul 2010). "Effects of age on dynamic accommodation". Ergonomics. 53 (7): 892–903. doi:10.1080/00140139.2010.489968. PMC 2908311. PMID 20582770.
- Lockhart, T.; Garvey, S.; Kelly, O. (2017). "Relationship between Serum 25-Hydroxyvitamin D Levels and Fall Risk as Measured by Dynamic Stability and Mobility-Related Outcomes in Older Adults". Clinical Nutrition. 36: S289. doi:10.1016/S0261-5614(17)30788-4.
- Lockhart, T.E., Frames, C.W., Soangra, R., and Lieberman A., Effects of Obesity and Fall Risk on Gait and Posture of Community- Dwelling Older Adults. International Journal of Prognostics and Health Management, ISSN 2153-2648, 2019 019
