= Swiss Enlightenment =

18th-century intellectual and philosophical movement in Switzerland

The Swiss Enlightenment was an intellectual and philosophical movement that emerged in the late 17th and 18th centuries, representing the Swiss participation in the broader Age of Enlightenment. The movement succeeded the era of confessionalism and Protestant orthodoxy, replacing dogmatic thought patterns with the conviction that autonomous human reason should be the ultimate arbiter of truth and falsehood. All acquired knowledge was to be subjected to rational criticism, while the Enlightenment postulated tolerance and freedom of opinion.

== Origins and early development ==
Coming from England, the Netherlands, and France, the Enlightenment movement spread relatively late to Switzerland. Towards the end of the 17th century, Protestant regions gradually came under the influence of enlightened ideas that replaced those of orthodoxy. Until then, Switzerland had been strongly marked by confessional differences. In 1712, the Reformed cantons of Zürich and Bern confronted the five Catholic cantons of central Switzerland during the second War of Villmergen, the last religious war in Switzerland. Clearly favorable to the Protestants, the outcome of this conflict was also a victory for the Enlightenment and the economically more developed regions. In Switzerland, where there was neither a court nor a central academy, the Enlightenment spread through the intellectual elite of Reformed cities, notably through pastors. These were graduates of higher schools (academies and colleges) that provided solid "philosophical" training based on the humanist tradition. Some of them had spent one or more semesters at a foreign university where they encountered more modern concepts. The University of Basel, the only university in Switzerland, had modest dimensions and an essentially regional vocation.

The turning point first occurred in Geneva with the theologian Jean-Alphonse Turrettini, who, as a professor at the academy, provided teaching imbued with enlightened ideas from 1697. In Neuchâtel and Basel, the change was almost contemporary and occurred under the aegis of Jean-Frédéric Osterwald and Samuel Werenfels. These three theologians, known as the "Helvetic triumvirate," brought their churches back to humanist Christianity. The institutions remained the same, but the spirit changed: a large place was accorded to rational thought. Thus, within Protestantism, doctrinal barriers weakened, contacts were established with Anglicans and Lutherans, and anti-Catholic diatribes were abandoned. Paul Wernle called this movement "reasoned orthodoxy," which, turning away from strict orthodoxy and extreme Puritanism, considered ethics as important as purity of faith.

The enlightened attitude spread from 1730 to Zürich and the Protestant parts of eastern Switzerland. Albrecht von Haller (1708-1777), as well as the brothers Niklaus Emanuel and Vinzenz Bernhard Tscharner, opened the doors of patrician Bern to this new spirit.

== Centers of interest and particularities ==
In the theological domain, the Enlightenment emphasized Christian action: biblical revelation was stripped of its irrational aspects, and people were content with simple principles derived from nature, to which individual conduct should correspond. Initially, the proponents of "reasoned orthodoxy" rejected Pietism, which nevertheless criticized the old and rigid orthodoxy like them. Over the years, they showed more understanding. They also sometimes provoked vigorous reactions from the official Church: in Basel, Neuchâtel, and Zürich, three pastors were deprived of their positions and banished from the country for having too freely questioned certain dogmas. As Enlightenment ideas became more widespread, they were nevertheless rehabilitated.

Simultaneously, a new concept spread in political and legal sciences: that of natural law. It was first developed by the Romandie school represented in Lausanne by Jean Barbeyrac, in Geneva by Jean-Jacques Burlamaqui, and in Neuchâtel by Emer de Vattel. Their system was based on "common sense" and "sound reason," which alone could provide the necessary criteria for understanding the world. It postulated inalienable rights, including freedom of conscience. If a person was deprived of their elementary rights, they had the right to resist tyranny. Natural law was valid for the individual as well as for society and the state, which should be "a natural society, organized according to the laws of freedom and equality." By acting according to natural law, humans could achieve happiness, the pursuit of which (eudaimonism) was the goal of human existence.

The Romandie school influenced the American independence movement, which considered the British monarchy a tyranny against which resistance was justified. For their part, Isaak Iselin in his Philosophische und patriotische Träume eines Menschenfreundes (1755) and Johann Georg Zimmermann in De l'orgueil national (1769) dealt with the state, particularly the republic. They were particularly interested in freedom of opinion, civic virtues, and citizen engagement for the republic.

The philosophical concepts developed by Francis Bacon and René Descartes stimulated mathematics and natural sciences. The foundations of the method were doubt and unconditional criticism based on reason. Mathematical evidence and scientific experience replaced Aristotelian categories. The Bernoulli brothers, Jacques and Jean from Basel, as well as their descendants, were pioneers in these fields. The Bernoullis soon became part of all the major European academies. Mathematicians and naturalists of international renown taught in Geneva and Zürich, while Schaffhausen housed the Wepfer medical school.

After initial resistance, particularly against the Copernican system, the Enlightenment spirit spread everywhere. Since theology in Switzerland participated in this current of thought, scientific research was not in opposition to Christianity and religion, whereas countries with Catholic predominance witnessed a struggle between enlightened minds and reactionary forces. The wonders of nature were placed on the same level as biblical miracles, notably by the Genevese naturalist Charles Bonnet. In the 18th century, a new field opened to scholars: the study of mountain ranges began, particularly the geology of the Alps, where nature seemed to manifest itself more clearly than anywhere else. This science became a privileged field of research for the Swiss, with Johann Jakob Scheuchzer in Zürich and Horace Bénédict de Saussure in Geneva.

In literature too, the Enlightenment brought original viewpoints. The Bernese Béat Louis de Muralt was the first to contrast in his Lettres sur les Anglais et les Français (1728) the naturalness and common sense of the former with the artificial and constrained world of the latter under Louis XIV. Haller's Versuch Schweizerischer Gedichten (1732) represented the pinnacle of this evolution. Haller rendered his philosophical conceptions in poetic form. He later wrote political novels where he evoked classical forms of the state and defended a moderate position close to that of Montesquieu. Thanks to Johann Jakob Bodmer and Johann Jakob Breitinger, Zürich became one of the centers of German literature. The "Zurichers" opposed the outdated style represented notably by the Leipzig scholar Johann Christoph Gottsched. Modern writers like Christoph Martin Wieland and Friedrich Gottlieb Klopstock sided with them.

Swiss history, as a particular case of a republic composed of republics, became the subject of renewed interest. Bodmer propagated a conception according to which the historian should not be content with being a chronicler but should let enthusiasm and sensualism penetrate their writing, in the sense of Ashley Cooper Shaftesbury. Under Bodmer's pen and that of his disciples, Swiss history was an ode to an entire people: the just motives of its wars were highlighted, its renunciation of territorial conquests, the sacred character of its laws, the courage and patriotism of its citizens, and the democratic origin of its constitutions.

Several Swiss contributed originally to Enlightenment philosophy. Zimmermann developed a psychology of the individual who finds in freedom and independence the guarantee of happiness. Johann Georg Sulzer advocated, well before Jean-Jacques Rousseau, the natural education of children. Iselin was interested in universal history; according to him, humanity had regularly progressed over time, from savagery toward civilization. He opposed nationalist tendencies in Europe as in Switzerland. The theologian Jakob Wegelin, the "Christian Rousseau of St. Gallen," developed a sort of universal history of ideas.

These new theories had practical effects on education and teaching. As primary school was more or less compulsory, instruction reached a fairly high level, even in the countryside. Reforms were undertaken, notably by Johann Heinrich Pestalozzi, which had important repercussions on 19th-century education. The pedagogical concern of the Enlightenment contributed to women's emancipation. Until then, women had their place in the home as mothers, without any pretension to education. This changed when foreign women married in Switzerland and Swiss women (such as Julie Bondeli in Bern) opened salons and introduced refined sociability into literary and philosophical circles.

== Organized Enlightenment: societies ==
Enlightenment supporters strengthened their influence by founding numerous societies and publishing various periodicals, such as the Mercure suisse, which reported on the country's intellectual life from 1732 to 1784. The Helvetic Enlightenment found synthesis in the Encyclopédie d'Yverdon (1770-1780), which aimed to be a less extremist alternative to the Encyclopédie of Diderot and d'Alembert. Supported by the country's social elite, societies developed rapidly in most Swiss cities and regions. Europe was covered with a network of correspondents in which the Swiss played a leading role. As a general rule, societies devoted themselves to practical, economic, or public utility goals. Reading societies offered newspapers and magazines for consultation, allowing their members to improve their general and literary culture. Economic societies were particularly concerned with promoting new agricultural methods. The modernization of school programs at all levels was another subject of concern, as was the improvement of professional training, for example in medicine.

All societies believed it was their responsibility to enlighten the public. Thus, the Helvetic Society of Schinznach considered itself not only as a circle of friends with more or less political motivation but also as the intellectual complement to the Federal Diet. This attitude was transparent in the annual presidential speeches. Despite its short existence, the Society of Citizens of Bern had an important role: it considered itself a patriotic society for the dissemination of Enlightenment ideas. By awarding a prize to Abbé Mably (1763) and to Cesare Beccaria (1765), it publicly took a position in favor of an enlightened philosophy of law and morality.

Natural science societies engaged as much in practical research as in reflections on natural philosophy, no longer based on ancient authorities (Aristotle), but on the data of pure reason. They believed in the continuous progress of science and despised previous epochs, especially the Middle Ages, which had contemplated nature through a filter of obscurantism. Among the organizations arising from the Enlightenment, Freemasonry was the most durable. Lodges were founded first in Geneva (1736), Lausanne (1739), and Zürich (1740), then in Basel (1768). The Freemasons were able to develop rituals that were a form of expression of the Enlightenment spirit.

== Enlightenment in Catholic Switzerland ==
By "Catholic Enlightenment," an elliptical and indeed unfortunate formula, we designate the proponents of a current of thought influenced by the Enlightenment but faithful to the Catholic faith. Sometimes this concept is abusively extended to ecclesiastical reform movements that referred to completely different models and intellectual currents (to medieval authorities, the Council of Trent, Jansenism, the Congregation of Saint-Maur). When they were able to take hold in the Catholic cantons, the Enlightenment always manifested itself in a moderate form, and most of the time, conservative tendencies prevailed.

The enlightened minds of Catholic Switzerland never questioned the magisterium of the Roman Church, nor revelation, nor religion itself. They rejected radical criticism against the concept of God and religious institutions. Enlightened patriotism only gained the political elites and secular clergy of Catholic cities, notably Lucerne and Solothurn, and sometimes even the countryside, in the second half of the 18th century. Condemning the immunity granted to ecclesiastics, demanding state control of the Church, and criticizing contemplative life as useless to society, Enlightenment supporters could hardly expect positive reception of their ideas within Swiss monasteries.

Nevertheless, Benedictines and Cistercians showed themselves more open than mendicant orders. The former, like the Jesuits, very early welcomed, without entirely approving them, the physico-teleological concepts (on the finality of the world) of philosophers Leibniz and Wolff. Important attempts at reform of primary school, girls' education, and teacher training were undertaken by regular and secular religious, close to those who devoted themselves to natural sciences and history according to the critical method.

Many ecclesiastics and patricians encountered Enlightenment ideas during stays abroad or during their training, for example by studying theology at the Collegium helveticum. In concert with lay patriots, Catholic ecclesiastics opposed papal supremacy and the centralism of the Holy See. Thus, they took sides for Ignaz Heinrich von Wessenberg's reforms in matters of liturgy, pastoral care, and religious education, clashing with the nuncio of Lucerne. However, they did not wish to provide popular education that the people, in the Catholic countryside, refused.

== Effects and consequences ==
Very quickly, Switzerland was considered a model of enlightened thought. Thus, under Frederick the Great, one-third of the members of the Berlin Academy and the majority of its scientific section were Swiss (Johann Bernoulli, Leonhard Euler, Johann Heinrich Lambert, Johann Bernhard Merian, Johann Georg Sulzer, Nicolas de Béguelin, Johannes von Müller, among others). They distinguished themselves notably by linking rationalism to personal ethics and by believing in a moral order of the world. Appointed by Tsarina Catherine II, Swiss also had a predominant place in the St. Petersburg Academy.

The Helvetic Enlightenment, until then very rational, was shaken in the 1770s by the Sturm und Drang movement. Thus, rationalism was gradually replaced by Romanticism. Switzerland, a "romantic" country par excellence in the eyes of many travelers, played a role in this evolution, which notably had repercussions on national historiography, with the publication of Johannes von Müller's Geschichte der Schweizer (1780), conceived according to the new model of historicism.

The Enlightenment movement was the affair of an elite composed of patricians and bourgeois (citizens of sovereign cities but also of small subject towns). It could not shake either the estate society or the federalist organization of the old Confederation. Only the Helvetic Revolution and the military defeats of 1798 allowed the advent of more modern regimes. Thus, the Helvetic Republic of 1798-1803 represented a first attempt at modernizing Switzerland. However, Switzerland remained torn until 1848 between federalist and conservative tendencies on one hand, and centralizing and progressive ones on the other. After the victory of radicalism during the Sonderbund War, Switzerland became Europe's first modern republic, thanks to a very balanced Constitution that democratically gave each canton the freedom necessary for autonomous development while creating indispensable central institutions without threatening federalist traditions.

== Bibliography ==
- Im Hof, Ulrich. Aufklärung in der Schweiz, 1970
- Taylor, S.S.B. "The Enlightenment in Switzerland", in The Enlightenment in National Context, edited by R. Porter and M. Teich, 1981
- Therrien, M. "La pensée suisse française au dix-huitième siècle", in Travaux de littérature, 4, 1991
- Im Hof, Ulrich. Les Lumières en Europe, 1993
- Röllin, S. "L'influence du piétisme et des Lumières sur les confessions au XVIIIe s.", in Histoire du christianisme en Suisse, edited by L. Vischer et al., 1995, 172-191, 311-312 Viguerie, Jean de. Histoire et dictionnaire du temps des Lumières, 1995
- Dubois, A. et al., ed. Les conditions de la vie intellectuelle et culturelle en Suisse romande au temps des Lumières, 1996
- Delon, M., ed. Dictionnaire européen des Lumières, 1997
- Marti, Hanspeter. Klosterkultur und Aufklärung in der Fürstabtei St. Gallen, 2003
- Zurbuchen, S. Patriotismus und Kosmopolitismus, 2003 Ackermann, F. Christian Franz Freiherr von Eberstein (1719-1797): ein gelehrter Domherr des Basler Domkapitels im 18. Jahrhundert, 2004
- Darnton, Robert; Schlup, M., ed. Le rayonnement d'une maison d'édition dans l'Europe des Lumières: la Société typographique de Neuchâtel 1769-1789, 2005
