= B16 =

B16 or B-16 may refer to:

== Transport ==
=== Road ===
- B16 (New York City bus) serving Brooklyn
- Honda B16 engine
- Volvo B16 engine
- Bundesstraße 16, federal highway in Germany

=== Rail & air ===
- LNER Class B16, a class of British steam locomotives
- Martin XB-16, a proposed bomber aircraft

== Sciences ==
=== Biology ===
- HLA-B16, an HLA - B serotype
- B16 melanoma, a cell line

=== Electrical & mechanical ===
- 16 amp, type B – a standard circuit breaker current rating
- B16 Standardization of Valves, Flanges, Fittings, and Gaskets - ASME committee and specification group.

=== Chemistry ===
- Boron-16 (B-16 or ^{16}B), an isotope of boron

== Other uses ==
- Pope Benedict XVI
- One of the ECO codes for the Caro–Kann Defence in chess
