= Jerry Lynn (disambiguation) =

Jerry Lynn (born 1963), is a professional wrestler.

Jerry Lynn may also refer to:

- Jerry Lynn (baseball) (1916–1972), Major League Baseball second baseman

== See also ==
- Jerry Lin, professor
- Gerry Lynn, Australian rules footballer
- Gerry Lynn (politician) (1952–2020), American politician
- Jeremy Lin, basketball player
- Jeremy Linn, swimmer
- Jerry Lynn Ross (born 1948), United States Air Force officer
- Jerry Lynn Williams, composer
- Jerry Lynn Young (born 1942), bank robber
- Jerry Lyne, basketball coach
