= Ira A. Fulton =

American businessman and philanthropist (1931–2026)

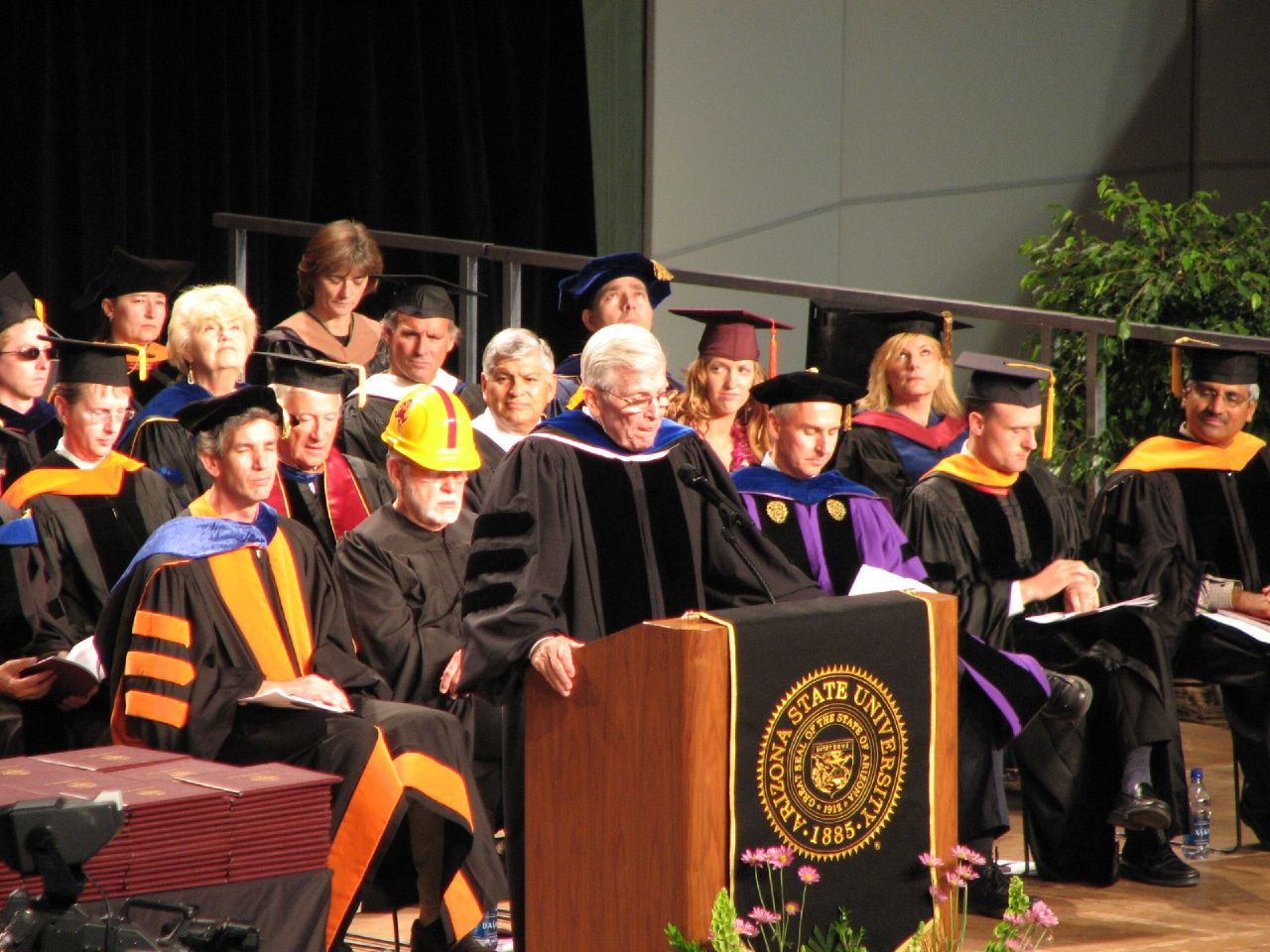
Fulton in 2007

Ira Amond Fulton (November 12, 1931 – August 21, 2026) was an American philanthropist, land developer, businessman, and founder of Fulton Homes. He was a major donor, particularly to educational institutions including Arizona State University, Brigham Young University, and Utah Valley University. In 2006, BusinessWeek listed Fulton 36th on its list of "The 50 Most Generous Philanthropists".

== Early life and education ==
Ira Fulton was born November 12, 1931, in Tempe, Arizona, to David and Myrtie Fulton, members of The Church of Jesus Christ of Latter-day Saints. He took his first job at age 11 as a paperboy for The Arizona Republic newspaper and did other odd jobs including delivering dairy, selling wild honey, and building fruit boxes. Fulton graduated from Tempe High School and attended Arizona State College at Tempe, now Arizona State University, on a football scholarship—interrupted for a year in the U.S. Air Force.

While at Arizona State, Ira met Mary Lou Henson, whom he married in June 1954.

== Business activities ==
After college, Fulton worked for National Cash Register and Signal Oil & Gas before starting his own data processing firms, National Retailer's Corporation and Computer Audit. He sold the firm in 1974, looking for an opportunity to travel less, and bought two stores of Eagleson's, a big and tall men's clothing chain. By 1993, Fulton owned 35 Eagleson's stores. The chain was sold in 1995, generating $225 million in revenue.

A nephew of Fulton's operated a struggling homebuilding company, to which he began loaning money in 1975. Fulton brought over an associate from Eagleson's with intentions to wind down the business. Instead, it grew, changing its name from Aston Construction to Fulton Homes in 1983. After years of maintaining a low profile, Fulton Homes began conscious image-building in 1994. Through the 1990s, Fulton Homes was one of the 10 largest homebuilders in the Phoenix market, focusing on mid- to high-end homes. The company filed for Chapter 11 bankruptcy protection in 2009, owing to the Great Recession, emerging two years later when Ira Fulton agreed to forgive a $25 million loan.

== Philanthropy ==
With the growth of their personal fortune, the Fultons became major philanthropists. In 1999, Fulton Homes gave away more money than it made in profit. The pair were named to BusinessWeek's list of the "50 Most Generous Philanthropists"; the publication estimated that by 2005, they had given away about $265 million, approximately 60% of their net worth.

=== Higher education ===
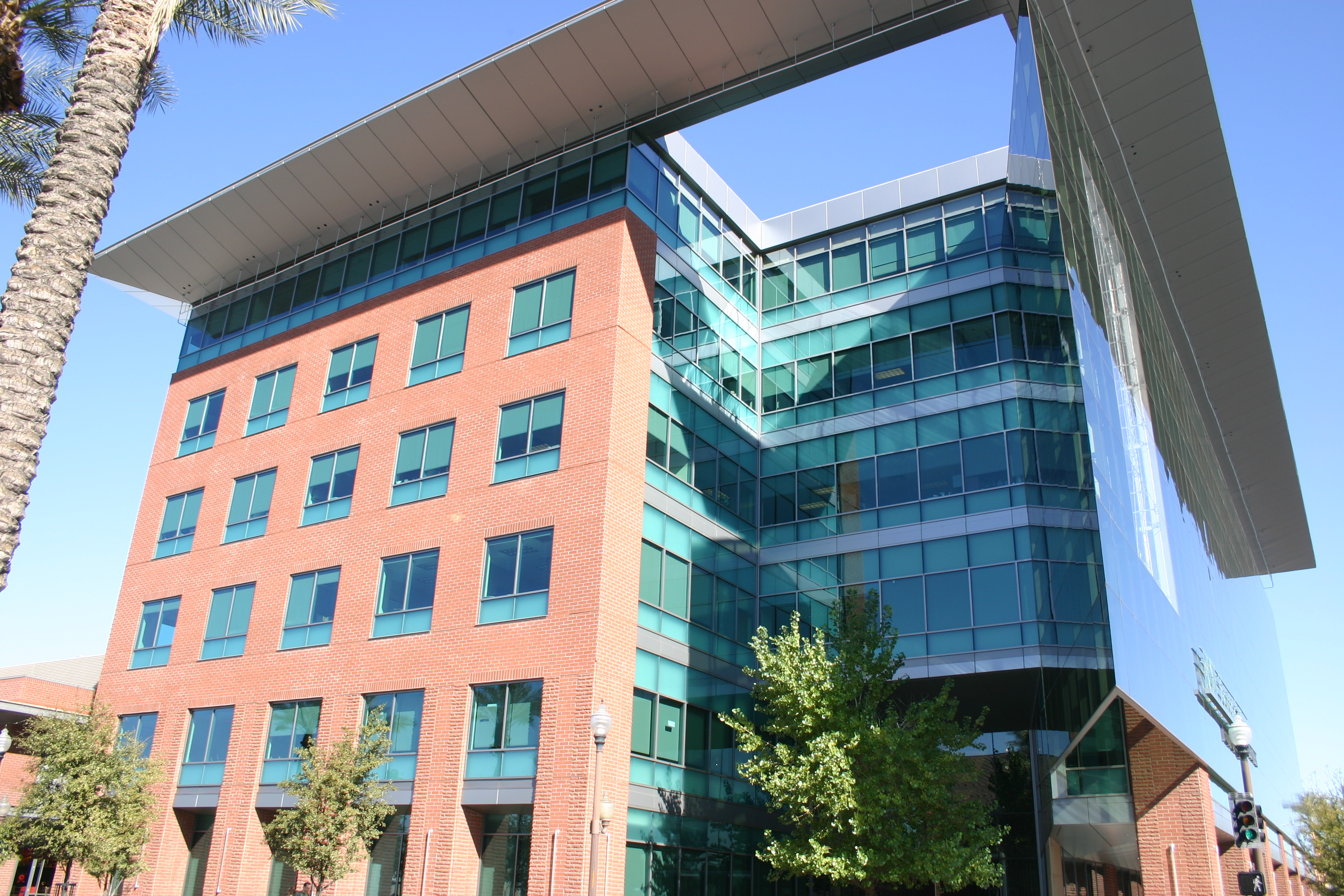
Fulton Center on ASU's Tempe campus is named for the Fultons.

In 2003, Fulton pledged $50 million to Arizona State University (ASU), at the time tied for the largest donation in the school's history. The gift named ASU's College of Engineering and Applied Sciences for Fulton; it is now the Ira A. Fulton Schools of Engineering. The move came after ASU's president, Michael M. Crow, visited with LDS Church leaders and resolved the matter of the future of ASU's Institute of Religion. Fulton donated another $100 million in 2005—renaming ASU's college of education for Mary Lou and supplying funding for the ASU Foundation and for a discretionary fund for Crow. He noted, "I love my state, and the state doesn't have enough money to fund education." The building housing the ASU Foundation, Fulton Center, was named for the Fultons.

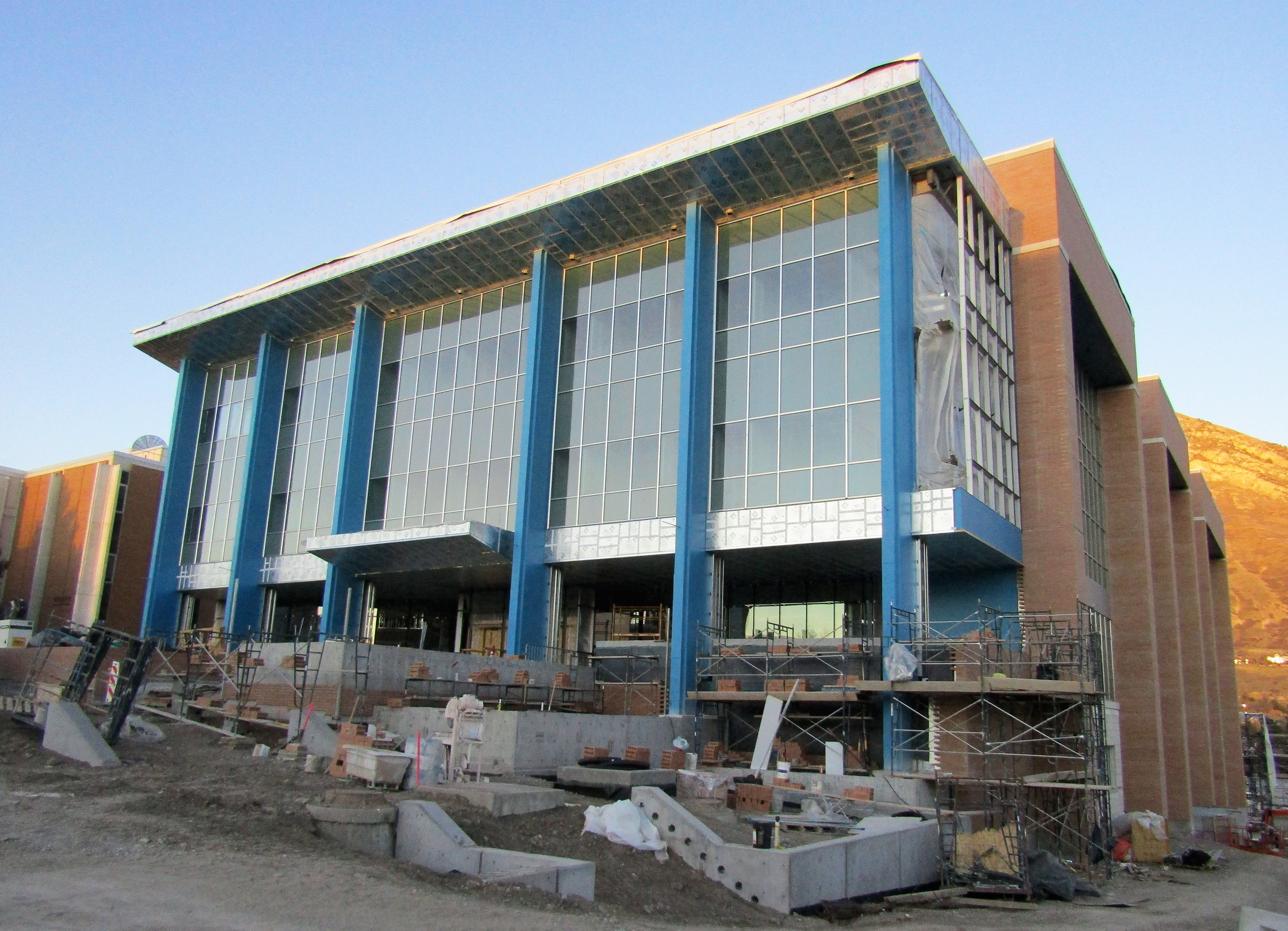
The Fultons' donations to BYU supported construction of this new engineering building.

In 1999, the Fultons began a relationship with Brigham Young University (BYU). At a dinner, BYU president Gordon B. Hinckley lamented that the university's capital campaign had raised $380 million and not $400 million. Fulton on the spot committed $20 million, later expanded to $50 million, to the institution, which in 2003 renamed its engineering college the Ira A. Fulton College of Engineering and Technology. Other donations named four chairs, named for Mary Lou Fulton; funded five supercomputers at BYU, also named for Mary Lou Fulton; and a new engineering building. The supercomputers accelerated the development of the BYU Center for Animation.

The Fultons played a major role in securing financial support to upgrade Utah Valley State College in Orem, Utah, to university status as Utah Valley University (UVU). He held a challenge to raise funding to match the state funding necessary to support the change in status for the institution. In 2016, the UVU library was named for the Fultons, who had contributed money for an endowment and the university's first endowed chair.

To the University of Utah, the Fultons donated more than $10 million by 2007, including in funding to restore the Block U.

=== Other ===
The Fultons donated $10 million to the Huntsman Cancer Institute in Salt Lake City; Mary Lou became unable to have children after suffering uterine cancer in her twenties. In 2011, they donated $2.5 million to fund ALS research at Barrow Neurological Institute in Phoenix; their son Greg was diagnosed with ALS in his late 40s. Fulton also funded swimming lessons and college scholarships.

== Personal life and death ==
Ira Fulton was a member of the Republican Party. In 2000, a donation he made to the Arizona School Choice Trust was highlighted as indirect support for Jeff Flake, then a congressional candidate and consultant to the trust, leading Flake to quit the post. He was one of Arizona's Republican presidential electors in the 2004 election.

The Fultons had three children. For years, they lived in Ahwatukee until moving to the Fulton Ranch subdivision of Chandler—which Fulton Homes built—in the 2000s. Mary Lou Fulton died in October 2015.

Fulton died on August 21, 2026, at the age of 94.

== See also ==
- D. Michael Quinn
