= Edward Kavazanjian =

American civil engineer

- Born: 1951 (age 74–75); Long Beach, New York, US
- Spouse: Debra Lee Taylor (m. 1977)

Academic background
- Education: BS, 1973, MS, 1975, Massachusetts Institute of Technology; PhD, 1978, University of California, Berkeley

Academic work
- Institutions: Ira A. Fulton Schools of Engineering; Stanford University

Edward Kavazanjian Jr. (born 1952) is an American civil engineer who specializes in geotechnical engineering. He is the Ira A. Fulton Professor of Geotechnical Engineering at the Arizona State University School of Sustainable Engineering and the Built Environmental.

== Early life and education ==
Kavazanjian was born in 1952. His father fought in World War II but began experiencing health problems due to his military experience. He graduated from Long Beach High School before enrolling at Massachusetts Institute of Technology for his Bachelor's and Master's degree. Upon completing his degrees, Kavazanjian pursued his civil engineering doctoral degree at the University of California, Berkeley (UC Berkeley). He was later recognized by UC Berkeley as distinguished alumni.

== Career ==
Following his PhD, Kavazanjian became an assistant professor at Stanford University for seven years before pursuing an engineering career outside of academia. As a civil engineer, Kavazanjian collaborated with the Federal Highway Administration on geotechnical earthquake engineering for highways and for the United States Environmental Protection Agency on seismic design of municipal solid waste landfills. He returned to academia in 2004 upon accepting a faculty position at the Arizona State University's (ASU) Ira A. Fulton Schools of Engineering. As an associate professor and Interim Chair of the Department of Civil and Environmental Engineering, Kavazanjian was a United States collaborator on the Bio‐Soils Interdisciplinary Science and Engineering Initiative.

During his early tenure at ASU, Kavazanjian focused much of his research on making landfills more economically and environmentally sustainable. Based on his recommendations for waste strength published in 1995, Kavazanjian and ASU researchers worked to determine how much solid waste could be safely contained in the landfills. Due to his research, he was appointed chair of the Committee on Geological and Geotechnical Engineering (COGGE) of the National Academies of Engineering and Science National Research Council. Kavazanjian also sat on the COGGE's Board of Earth Sciences and Resources and on the ASCE Technical Region Board of Governors. He also received the 2008 Outstanding Engineering Educator of the Year from the National Society of Professional Engineers and 2009 Ralph B. Peck Award from the American Society of Civil Engineers. In November 2009, Kavazanjian was elected a Fellow of the American Society of Civil Engineers and president of the organization's Geo-Institute. In 2012, Kavazanjian was elected to serve a three-year term on the Board of Governors of the United States University Council for Geotechnical Education and Research. He also received the Karl Terzaghi Award from the American Society of Civil Engineers in recognition of his "career achievements in the field of soil mechanics, subsurface and earthwork engineering, as well as subsurface and earthwork construction."

As a result of his "outstanding achievements in geotechnical engineering" Kavazanjian was elected a member of the National Academy of Engineering in 2013. He was also appointed the Ira A. Fulton Professor of geotechnical engineering in 2013 and named chair of a National Research Council committee that would oversee the "State of the Art and Practice in Earthquake Induced Soil Liquefaction Assessment" study. While serving in these roles, Kavazanjian became Principal Investigator and Director of ASU's new National Science Foundation Center for Bio-mediated and Bio-inspired Geotechnics. In the same year, Kavazanjian was promoted to the rank of Regents’ Professor, the highest faculty honor at the university.

== Personal life ==
Kavazanjian married Debra Lee Taylor in 1977. Divorced in 1981.
