= ASME NQA =

Industry consensus standard for nuclear quality assurance

ASME NQA-1 (Nuclear Quality Assurance-1) is an industry consensus standard created and maintained by the American Society of Mechanical Engineers (ASME). The latest edition was issued on July 24, 2024 (NQA-1-2024). However, the most commonly used version in the supply chain is NQA-1-2008 with the NQA-1a-2009 addendum or newer. Any organization submitting an application for a new design may use up to the 2022 edition. This is the case because these are versions endorsed by the NRC.

== NQA-1 Certification Program ==
ASME offers an NQA-1 Certification Program. The ASME NQA-1 Certification program provides a means for an organization supplying items or services which provide a safety function for nuclear facilities to have its Quality Assurance Program recognized by ASME as having had its Quality Assurance Program audited and verified to be in conformance with the requirements of the ASME NQA-1 Standard. It provides a foot in the door to the industry; however, it does not relieve the buying organization from going through its vendor qualification process.

The NQA-1 Certification Program is developed, maintained and administered by ASME and industry subject matter experts serving as volunteers on ASME's committees. The NQA-1 Quality Program Certificate is available to organizations implementing the ASME NQA-1 Standard, Part I and Part II, or portions there of, however, An NQA-1 Quality Program Certificate is not available to an organization for activities pertaining to weaponry and for Owners of facilities handling and/or utilizing nuclear material. Starting with the 2008 edition, organizations have the option to either update their QA Program to meet the latest published edition/addenda of the ASME NQA-1 Standard, or, freeze its program to a specific edition/addenda.

The goal of NQA-1 Certification is to promote consistent application and understanding of the requirements of the NQA-1 Standard throughout the supply chain. By having ASME oversee the program, they ensures a fair and unbiased evaluation of a Supplier's QA Program. Certification is based upon 1 Triennial Program Audit and 2 Interim Audits within a 3-year certification period. An NQA-1 QA Certificate does not apply to or replace the certification requirements to supply, manufacture, construction and fabrication of items falling under the scope of the ASME Boiler and Pressure Vessel Code, Section III, Rules for Construction of Nuclear Facility Components. An audit does not pre-qualify or exempt an organization from a qualification audit being performed by the Purchaser of the items or services provided by the organization.

== Standards Committee on Nuclear Quality Assurance (NQA) ==
The Standards Committee on Nuclear Quality Assurance (NQA) is one of various standards committee managed by the Board on Nuclear Codes and Standards (BNCS). NQA in turn has various subcommittees reporting to it which are responsible for the maintenance and revision of different sections in NQA-1. These subcommittees include the following:

- NQA Subcommittee on Applications
- NQA Subcommittee on Assessment and Verification
- NQA Subcommittee on Engineering and Procurement
- NQA Subcommittee on Interfaces and Administration* NQA Subcommittee on International Activities
- NQA Subcommittee on Program Management Process
- NQA Subcommittee on Software Quality Assurance
- NQA Subcommittee on Waste Management

== Organization of NQA-1 ==
Part I of the NQA-1 Standard provides requirements that prescribe the extent of controls needed in specific areas of a nuclear quality program (an ASME NQA program). The 18 requirements found in NQA-1 are derived from the 18 Criteria found NRC 10CFR50 Appendix B Quality Assurance Criteria for Nuclear Power Plants and Fuel Reprocessing Plants and are as follows:

- Requirement 1 Organization
- Requirement 2 Quality Assurance Program
- Requirement 3 Design Control
- Requirement 4 Procurement Document Control
- Requirement 5 Instructions, Procedures and Drawings
- Requirement 6 Document Control
- Requirement 7 Control of Purchased Items and Services
- Requirement 8 Identification and Control of Items
- Requirement 9 Control of Special Processes
- Requirement 10 Inspection
- Requirement 11 Test Control
- Requirement 12 Control of Measuring and Test Equipment
- Requirement 13 Handling, Storage and Shipping
- Requirement 14 Inspection, Test and Operating Status
- Requirement 15 Control of Nonconforming Items
- Requirement 16 Corrective Action
- Requirement 17 Quality Assurance Records
- Requirement 18 Audits

Part II contains supplemental quality assurance requirements - specifically, how to perform specific activities under a program developed to Part I.

Additionally, Parts III and IV of the Standard provide non-mandatory subparts that contain further guidance and more in-depth discussion on certain aspects (e.g. commercial grade dedication).

== Editions of NQA-1 and related documents ==
The historical editions of ASME NQA-1 Quality Assurance Requirements for Nuclear Facility Applications are as follows:

- NQA-1-2024
- NQA-1-2022
- NQA-1-2019
- NQA-1-2017
- NQA-1-2015
- NQA-1-2012
- NQA-1-2008 w/addenda NQA-1a-2009 and NQA-1b-2011 (Note: no more addendum will be issued)
- NQA-1-2004 w/addenda NQA-1a-2005 and NQA-1b-2007
- NQA-1-2000 w/addenda NQA-1a-2002
- NQA-1-1997 w/addenda NQA-1a-1999
- NQA-1-1994 w/addendum NQA-1a-1995 (Note: This edition is a consolidation of NQA-1 and NQA-2)
- NQA-1-1989 w/addenda NQA-1a-1989, NQA-1b-1991, and NQA-1c-1992
- NQA-1-1986 w/addenda NQA-1a-1987, NQA-1b-1987, and NQA-1c-1988
- NQA-1-1983 w/addenda NQA-1a-1983, NQA-1b-1984, and NQA-1c-1985

Other applicable standards and regulations pertaining to Quality Assurance in nuclear facilities are as follows:

- 10 CFR Part 50 Appendix B (NRC)
- 10 CFR Part 71, subpart H
- 10 CFR Part 72, subpart G
- DOE O 414.1D (DOE)
- ASME Section III Quality Requirements Articles NCA 3800 and NCA 4000 ASME Boiler and Pressure Vessel Code (BPVC)
- N45.2 (predecessor standard of NQA-1)
- ASME NQA.TR-2020 NQA - Evolution of Quality Assurance Principles and Requirements in the U.S. Nuclear Industry
