= George Z. Voyiadjis =

American academic

George Zino Voyiadjis
- Education: Ain Shams University (B.Sc.); California Institute of Technology, (M.Sc.); Columbia University (D.Eng.Sc.)
- Awards: Khan International Medal (2012); Nathan M. Newmark Medal (2008)
- Scientific career
- Fields: Applied Mechanics
- Workplaces: Louisiana State University
- Thesis: Large Elasto-Plastic Deformations of Solids (1973)
- Doctoral advisor: Maciej P. Bieniek

George Zino Voyiadjis is an American civil engineer. He has been on the faculty of Louisiana State University in Baton Rouge, Louisiana, since 1980, and is Boyd Professor and Bingham C. Stewart Distinguished Professor in its department of civil and environmental engineering. He specializes in mechanics of materials and damage mechanics, and the numerical modeling thereof.

== Education ==
Voyiadjis took a B.Sc. in civil engineering from Ain Shams University in Cairo in 1969, an M.Sc. in civil engineering from California Institute of Technology in Pasadena in 1970, and a D.Eng.Sc. in engineering mechanics from Columbia University in New York in 1973.

== Awards ==
In 2022, Voyiadjis was awarded the Nadai Medal by the American Society of Mechanical Engineers.

== Books ==
- with Peter Issa Kattan: Advances in Damage Mechanics: Metals and Metal Matrix Composites. Amsterdam: Elsevier, 1999. ISBN 9780080436012; second edition 2006.
- with Peter Issa Kattan: Damage Mechanics with Finite Elements: Practical Applications with Computer Tools. Berlin; Heidelberg; New York: Springer, 2001. ISBN 9783540422792.
- with Peter Issa Kattan: Mechanics of Composite Materials with MATLAB. Berlin; Heidelberg; New York: Springer, 2005 ISBN 3540243534.
- with Peter Issa Kattan: Damage Mechanics. Boca Raton: Taylor & Francis, 2005. ISBN 9780824727574.
- with Chung R. Song: The Coupled Theory of Mixtures in Geomechanics with Applications, 2006. Berlin; Heidelberg; New York: Springer. ISBN 9783540251309
- with Pawel Woelke: Elasto-Plastic and Damage Analysis of Plates and Shells, 2008. Berlin; Heidelberg; New York: Springer. ISBN 9783540793519.
- with Mohammadreza Yaghoobi: Size Effects in Plasticity, 2019. London; San Diego, CA: Elsevier. ISBN 9780128135136.
- with Yooseob Song: Gradient-enhanced Continuum Plasticity: Theories, Experiments and Numerical Methods, 2020. Amsterdam: Elsevier. ISBN 9780128177662.
