= Nael Barakat =

Kuwaiti–American mechanical engineer

Nael Barakat is a Kuwaiti mechanical engineer.

== Educational and career ==
Barakat earned a bachelor's degree in mechanical engineering from Kuwait University in 1989. He subsequently moved to Canada to pursue a master's degree and doctorate in the same subject, from Concordia University in 1996, and McMaster University in 2000, respectively. Barakat began his teaching career as an assistant professor at Lake Superior State University in the United States, then joined the Grand Valley State University faculty until moving to Texas A&M University in 2016. After leaving TAMU, Barakat held a professorship at the University of Texas at Tyler.

In 2012, Barakat was elected to the World Federation of Engineering Organizations Anti-Corruption Committee. In 2022, he began serving a four-year term on the U.S. Fulbright Specialist Program Roster. The following year, Barakat was elected chair of the National Engineering Ethics Board.

== Awards and honors ==
Barakat was elected a fellow of the American Society of Mechanical Engineers in 2010. The ASME awarded Barakat the Edwin F. Church Medal in 2020.
