= Oscar Barton Jr. =

American professor of engineering, Morgan State University

- Born: Washington D.C.
- Education: Tuskegee University, Howard University
- Scientific career
- Workplaces: Morgan State University

Oscar Barton Jr. is an American professor of engineering and dean of the engineering school at Morgan State University.

== Early life and education ==
Barton was born in Washington D.C.

In 1984, Barton graduated from Tuskegee University with a bachelor's degree in mechanical engineering. Barton earned his master's in mechanical engineering in 1987 and his Ph.D. in 1993 - both from Howard University. In 1987, Barton received a graduate fellowship from Pacific Telesis Senior Fellows Programs in furtherance of his work in materials science with a focus on lattice structuring.

== Career ==
Barton established the nuclear engineering program at the United States Naval Academy, where he was the first African American engineer to achieve tenured status. In 2014, he established the mechanical engineering program at George Mason University. Barton was named dean of Morgan State University's Clarence M. Mitchell School of Engineering in 2020.

Barton has a professional engineering license from Maryland, and he has served on the American Society of Mechanical Engineers (ASME) Committee on Engineering Accreditation and the ASME Mechanical Engineering Department Head Executive Committee.

In 2009, Barton received the award for College Level Promotion of Education from US Black Engineer & Information Technology magazine.

Barton received the 2022 District of Columbia Council of Engineering and Architectural Societies (DCCEAS) Lifetime Achievement Award.

In 2024, Barton was awarded the Edwin F. Church Medal by the American Society of Mechanical Engineers (ASME) for his contributions to mechanical engineering education.

== Family ==
Barton has one son and two daughters. His son is a software engineer, graduating from the University of Maryland, College Park with an electrical engineering degree. His daughter earned her master's degree from George Washington University and studied health policy at Howard University.
