= Kendra Sharp =

American professor of engineering

Kendra Vail Sharp
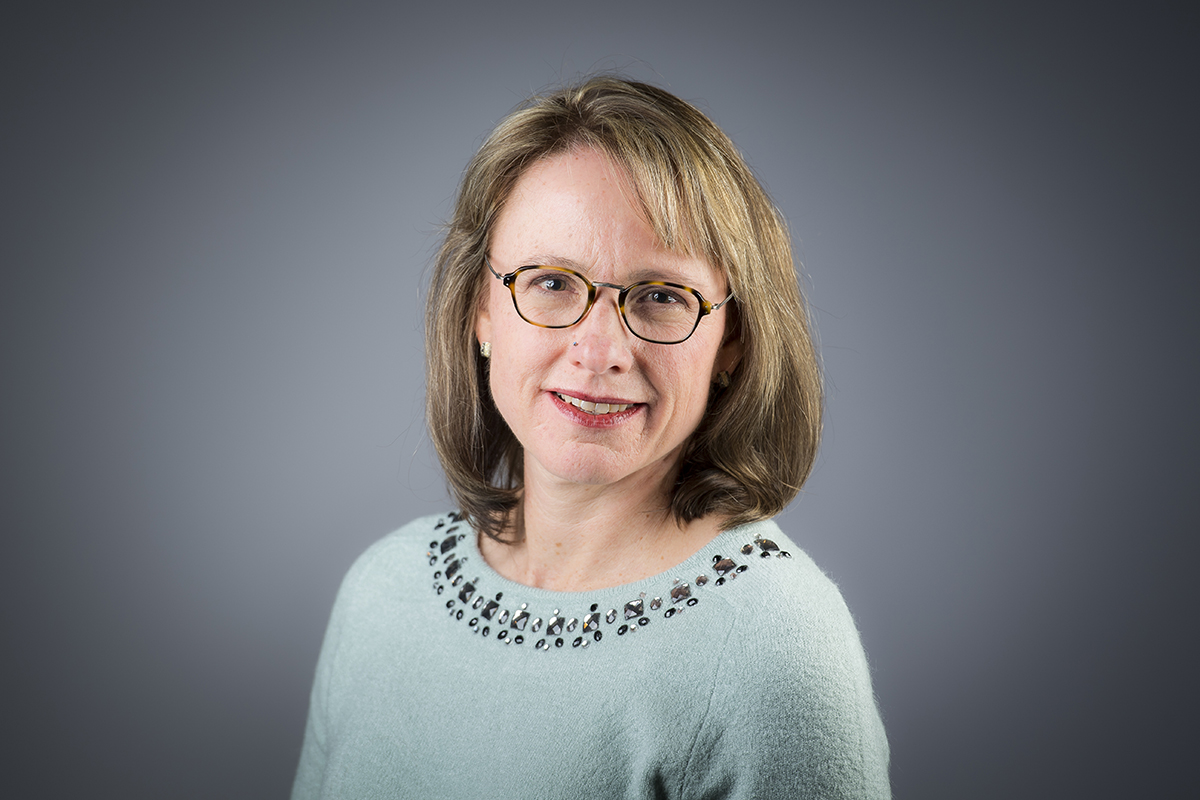

Academic background
- Education: University of Illinois at Urbana–Champaign (BS, PhD); University of Cambridge (MPhil); University of California, Berkeley (MS)

Academic work
- Discipline: Mechanical Engineering
- Sub-discipline: Experimental Fluid Mechanics
- Institutions: Oregon State University; National Science Foundation

Kendra Vail Sharp is an American engineer. Since March 2025, Sharp serves as the dean of the School of Engineering at Santa Clara University. Prior to this leadership appointment, Sharp was a professor of mechanical engineering and the Richard and Gretchen Evans Professor in Humanitarian Engineering at Oregon State University College of Engineering.

== Education ==
Sharp completed a Bachelor of Science at University of Illinois at Urbana–Champaign in 1993. In 1994, she completed a master of philosophy at University of Cambridge. Sharp earned a master of engineering from University of California, Berkeley in 1996. In 2001, she earned a doctor of philosophy from University of Illinois at Urbana–Champaign. Her dissertation was titled "Experimental investigation of liquid and particle -laden flows in microtubes." Sharp's doctoral advisor was Ronald Adrian.

== Career ==
Sharp was appointed dean of the School of Engineering at Santa Clara University in August 2024. Previous to this, she joined the faculty at Oregon State University (OSU) in mechanical engineering in 2010. She also served as the director of the humanitarian engineering program at OSU. In 2015, Sharp was named the Richard and Gretchen Evans Professor of Humanitarian Engineering.

Sharp's expertise is in experimental fluid mechanics. She researches international development, applying technology to humanitarian engineering, and sustainable energy and water systems.

== Awards and honors ==
In 2018, Sharp received the Edwin F. Church Medal.

== Personal life ==
In graduate school, Sharp was married to David Hill.
