= Vincent Wilczynski =

American engineer and academic administrator

- Education: United States Coast Guard Academy; Massachusetts Institute of Technology; Catholic University of America
- Occupations: Engineer; academic administrator
- Employers: United States Coast Guard Academy (retired); Yale School of Engineering & Applied Science
- Known for: Service in U.S. Coast Guard; leadership at Yale SEAS
- Title: James S. Tyler Director, Yale Center for Engineering Innovation & Design; Deputy Dean, Yale School of Engineering & Applied Science
- Awards: Edwin F. Church Medal (2005)

Vincent Wilczynski is an American engineer, known particularly for his work in STEM education.

== Education and career ==
Wilczynski completed a bachelor's of science at the United States Coast Guard Academy, then earned a master's of science in mechanical engineering from the Massachusetts Institute of Technology, followed by a doctorate in the same subject at the Catholic University of America. He served in the United States Coast Guard for 27 years, including dean of engineering at the USGCA, before retiring with the rank of captain in 2010 for a deputy deanship at the Yale School of Engineering & Applied Science and as James S. Tyler Director of Yale's Center for Engineering Innovation & Design. The USGCA granted Wilczynski emeritus status in 2016. As of 2026, Wilczynski serves on the FIRST robotics executive advisory board and is the Board Treasurer.

== Honors and awards ==
The American Society of Mechanical Engineers awarded Wilczynski the Edwin F. Church Medal in 2005.
