= How to Leave the House =

2024 novel by Nathan Newman

- US 1st edition cover
- Author: Nathan Newman
- Language: English
- Genre: Literary fiction, comic novel
- Publisher: Abacus (UK); Viking Penguin (US)
- Publication date: 2024
- Publication place: United Kingdom; United States
- Media type: Print (hardcover, paperback), ebook
- Pages: 320 pp
- ISBN: 978-0349145631 (UK 1st ed)

How to Leave the House is the 2024 debut novel by British author Nathan Newman. It follows a young man who crosses paths with the residents of a Midlands town while searching for a missing package. The novel was published by Little, Brown in the UK, and Viking Penguin in the US.

== Background ==
The book was completed while Newman attended New York University remotely, under the mentorship of Zadie Smith. Before the novel was published, the television rights were acquired by Fremantle, after a competitive auction.

== Plot summary ==
How to Leave the House centres on 23-year-old NatWest, as he embarks on a quest around a Midlands town to find a missing package on the eve of his departure for university. The novel alternates between Natwest's point of view and the perspectives of the various residents of the town he meets, including a local dentist obsessed with painting mouths, an Imam involved in a complex relationship with a Vicar, a teacher recovering from cancer, and a red-pilled teenage girl.

== Reception ==
Writing for The New York Times, critic Bobby Finger writes that "Newman weaves the analytical and the absurd with a raucous grace" praising the "audacious two-part conclusion, which I instantly flipped back and reread upon finishing." The Washington Post similarly applauded the novel, observing that "this entertaining debut feels fresh and young, portraying modern life with a mixture of humor and reflection." Reviewing for The Associated Press Rob Merrill noted that "Newman certainly has something to say about the up-and-coming generation" calling them "a bold new voice, and one to watch."
