= ASME B16 =

The ASME B16 is a set of standards developed by the American Society of Mechanical Engineers (ASME) covering valves, flanges, fittings, gaskets, and valve actuators used in pressure services. These standards are maintained by the ASME B16 Standardization Committee, which operates under ASME's Board on Pressure Technology Codes and Standards.

The B16 standards are part of ASME's broader portfolio of nearly 600 codes and standards developed across various engineering disciplines. Other major ASME series include the ASME Boiler and Pressure Vessel Code (BPVC), Elevators and Escalators (A17 Series), Piping and Pipelines (B31 Series), Bioprocessing Equipment (BPE), Nuclear Facility Applications (NQA), and Process Performance Test Codes (PTC).

The B16 Standards Committee typically meets annually in March at locations across the United States. These meetings are open to the public and provide a forum for reviewing and updating standards based on technological advances and industry needs.

== ASME B16 Technical Subcommittees ==
Membership on the B16 Standards Committee and its Subordinate groups include a variety of representations from the field in various interest classifications. These interest classifications are; Manufacturer, Distributor, Material Manufacturer, Consumer/User, Designer/Constructor, Regulatory, Insurance/Inspection and General Interest. The B16 Technical Subcommittees under the B16 Standards Committee review and maintain the ASME B16 Standards within their respective scopes.
