= Wepfer =

Wepfer is a surname. Notable people with the surname include:

- Johann Jakob Wepfer (1620–1695), Swiss pathologist and pharmacologist
- William J. Wepfer, American mechanical engineer
