= Aditi Chattopadhyay =

Indian-American mechanical engineer

Aditi Chattopadhyay is an Indian-American mechanical and aerospace engineer known for her research on wide-ranging topics including composite laminates. automated health monitoring, and the dynamics of rotor wings. She is Regents Professor and Ira A. Fulton Chair Professor of Mechanical and Aerospace Engineering at Arizona State University, where she directs the Adaptive Intelligent Materials & Systems Center.

Chattopadhyay earned a bachelor's degree in aeronautical engineering from IIT Kharagpur in 1980. She went to Georgia Tech for graduate study in aerospace engineering, earning a master's degree and Ph.D. there.

Chattopadhyay was named a Fellow of the American Society of Mechanical Engineers in 2001, and is also a Fellow of the American Institute of Aeronautics and Astronautics. In 2013 the Indian Institute of Technology gave her their Distinguished Alumnus Award.
