= Joseph A. Falcon =

American mechanical engineer and business executive (1923–2019)

Joseph Albert Falcon (March 9, 1923 – July 18, 2019) was an American mechanical engineer, and business executive, who served as president of the American Society of Mechanical Engineers in 1992-93. Falcon was credited for his contributions in the energy field, which "encompassed nuclear power, geothermal facilities, fossil fuel-fired plants, alternative energy sources, and the geopolitics of oil and energy economics."

== Biography ==
=== Youth and education ===
Falcon was born in 1923 in Brooklyn, the son of Morris Falcon and Louise (Uziel) Falcon. He obtained his BSc in mechanical engineering 1943 from the Polytechnic Institute of Brooklyn (now New York University Tandon School of Engineering), and his MSc in mechanical engineering 1947 from the Stevens Institute of Technology.

Falcon also obtained a certificate in business management at the University of California, Los Angeles in 1955. He was a registered professional engineer in the states of California and New York.

=== Career and honors ===
After his graduation, Falcon started his career as mechanical engineer for Sanderson & Porter Inc. in New York City. From 1970 to 1987 he was project engineering manager at the Bechtel Power Corporation, and in 1987 started his own firm, J.A. Falcon & Associates, Consultants in Energy Systems.

In 1992-93 Falcon served as President of the American Society of Mechanical Engineers. In 1991 he was awarded the Edwin F. Church Medal, and in 2011 he was elected honorary member of the ASME.

== Selected publications ==
Articles:

- Balent, R., and J. A. Falcon. "The Atomics International Fast Breeder Reactor Program," IEEE Conference Paper 68 CP 704-PWR, presented at ASME/IEEE Joint Power Generation Conference, San Francisco, September 15–19, 1968. 5.
- Falcon, J. A., and J. Jacobson. "Steam Cycle Considerations for Large Heavy Water Moderated Organic-Cooled Reactor Plants." Proc. Amer. Power Conf., 28: 126-38 (1966).. Atomics International, Canoga Park, Calif., 1966.
- Siegel, Sidney, Simcha Golan, and Joseph A. Falcon. "Application of nuclear energy to large-scale power and desalting plants." Nuclear Engineering and Design 4.3 (1966): 225-232.
- Dieckamp, H. M., J. A. Falcon, and B. L. Hoffman. "Planning Today for Tomorrow's Nuclear Needs." Nucl. News, 10: No. 9, 48-55 (Sept. 1967). (1967).
