= Efstathios E. Michaelides =

Greek-American mechanical engineer

Efstathios E. Michaelides (born 13 February 1955) is a Greek-American mechanical engineer.

Michaelides earned a Bachelor of Arts in engineering science and economics from the University of Oxford in 1977. He then completed graduate study in engineering science at Brown University, obtaining a master's degree in 1979 and a doctorate in 1980. Michaelides began his teaching career at the University of Delaware upon graduating from Brown. In 1990, he joined the Tulane University faculty as head of the mechanical engineering department. After two years in the role, Michaelides became associate dean for graduate studies and research within Tulane's School of Engineering. Between 2002 and 2007, Michaelides served as director of the South-Central Center of the National Institute for Global Environmental Change. In 1998, he was appointed to Tulane's Leo S. Weil Professorship of Mechanical Engineering, which he held until 2007. In 2006, Michaelides founded the Department of Mechanical and Energy Engineering at the University of North Texas, and held the department chairmanship until 2007. Upon leaving Tulane and UNT, Michaelides was named Robert F. McDermott Chair in Engineering at the University of Texas at San Antonio and concurrently held the founding directorship of the Center on Simulation, Visualization and Real Time Computing. At Texas Christian University, Michaelides is the W. A. "Tex" Moncrief Jr. Founding Chair of Engineering.

== Honors and awards ==
The American Society of Mechanical Engineers awarded Michaelides the Edwin F. Church Medal in 2021.
