= Hüseyin Şehitoğlu =

Turkish mechanical engineer (born 1957)

Huseyin Sehitoglu
- Born: October 23, 1957 (age 68); Istanbul, Turkey
- Scientific career
- Fields: Thermo-mechanical fatigue

Hüseyin Şehitoğlu (born October 23, 1957) is a Turkish mechanical engineer who holds the John, Alice, and Sarah Nyquist Endowed Chair at the Department of Mechanical Engineering at the University of Illinois at Urbana-Champaign, United States. Hüseyin Şehitoğlu received a B.S. in mechanical engineering from City University London, in 1979, and a M.S., and Ph.D. in theoretical and applied mechanics from the University of Illinois at Urbana-Champaign, in 1981 and 1983, respectively.

Professor Şehitoğlu served as department head of the Mechanical Engineering Department at the University of Illinois from 2004 to 2009. He was named a Grayce Wicall Gauthier Professor from 2000 to 2004 and then a C.J. Gauthier Professor from 2004 to 2008. In 2008, Şehitoğlu was named the first ever John, Alice, and Sarah Nyquist Endowed Chair in Mechanical Science and Engineering. In addition, Professor Şehitoğlu is a fellow of the American Society of Mechanical Engineers and was a recipient of the society's Nadai Medal in 2007. From 2003 to 2008 Şehitoğlu was Editor of the ASME Journal of Engineering Materials and Technology. In 2012, Şehitoğlu was awarded by the University of Illinois for his excellence in graduate-level mentoring.

In 2020, Şehitoğlu was the recipient of the Khan Plasticity Award for "“outstanding life-long contributions in the field of plasticity primarily through research contributions." In 2022, Şehitoğlu was given the Moris Cohen Award from The Minerals, Metals & Materials Society. This award recognizes an individual who has made exceptional contributions to the science and/or technology of materials properties. Also in 2022, Şehitoğlu was elected an honorary member of the American Society of Mechanical Engineers “for outstanding contributions in mechanical engineering and materials science, particularly in the area of fatigue of materials, and for lifelong engagement with ASME and the mechanical engineering community."
