= Ying-Cheng Lai =

Chinese theoretical physicist

- Born: Ying-Cheng Lai
- Education: Zhejiang University; University of Maryland.; Arizona State University.
- Scientific career
- Fields: Math and Physics (theoretical)
- Workplaces: University of Maryland, College Park

Ying-Cheng Lai is a Chinese theoretical physicist/electrical engineer who works in the field of chaos theory and complex dynamical systems. He is among the pioneers in the field of relativistic quantum chaos. Currently, he works at Arizona State University as a Regents Professor. He also holds an ISS Chair Professorship in Electrical Engineering.

== Research areas ==
Ying-Cheng Lai received BS and MS degrees in optical engineering from Zhejiang University in 1982 and 1985, and MS and PhD degrees in physics from University of Maryland at College Park in 1989 and 1992, respectively. He wrote his PhD thesis on classical and quantum chaos under Celso Grebogi, James A. Yorke and Edward Ott. From 1992 to 1994 he was a postdoctoral fellow in the Biomedical Engineering Department at the Johns Hopkins University School of Medicine under Raimond Winslow and Murray Sachs. He joined the University of Kansas in 1994 as an assistant professor of physics and mathematics and became an associate professor in 1998. In 1999, he came to Arizona State University as an associate professor of mathematics and an associate professor of electrical engineering. He was promoted to professor of mathematics and professor of electrical engineering in 2001. In 2005, he switched full-time into electrical engineering. From 2009 to 2017, he was the Sixth Century Chair in Electrical Engineering at University of Aberdeen, Scotland, UK. Since January 2014, he has been the ISS Endowed Professor of Electrical Engineering at Arizona State University. In November 2021, ASU named him Regents Professor.

Y.-C. Lai has published 550 papers, with about 510 in refereed journals. He has directed 22 PhD and 20 master's theses and supported 14 postdoctoral fellows. He has given approximately 280 invited lectures and colloquia all over the world. His papers have been cited more than 26,500 times. His current Google-Scholar based H-index is 77 and i10 index is 400.

Y.-C. Lai served on the editorial board of Physical Review E from 2014 to 2017. He currently serves on the editorial board of Philosophical Transactions of Royal Society A, is an associated editor of Scientific Reports and International Journal of Bifurcation and Chaos. From 2010 to 2014, he was a co-editor of Europhysics Letters.

Y.-C. Lai's current research interests are nonlinear dynamics and chaos, machine learning as applied to complex dynamical systems, relativistic quantum chaos, complex networks, mathematical biology, theoretical ecology, data analysis and signal processing.

== Awards ==
Y.-C. Lai received the Air Force Presidential Early Career Award for Scientists and Engineers (PECASE) from the White House in 1997. In the same year, he also received the Faculty Career Award from the National Science Foundation. In 1999, he was elected as a Fellow of the American Physical Society with the citation: For his many contributions to the fundamentals of nonlinear dynamics and chaos. In 2001, he served as Program Chair of Statistical and Nonlinear Physics for the APS March Meeting. In 2003, he received an NSF ITR Award. In 2008, he received the Outstanding Referee Award from the American Physical Society. In 2016 he was one of the 15 selected nationwide by the Department of Defense for the Vannevar Bush Faculty Fellowship, the Department of Defense's most prestigious single-investigator award that supports basic research with the potential for transformative impact (formerly known as NSSEFF – National Security Science and Engineering Faculty Fellowship). In February 2018, he was elected as a Corresponding Fellow of the Royal Society of Edinburgh (a foreign member of the National Academy of Sciences and Letters of Scotland). In July 2020, he was elected as a Foreign Member of Academia Europaea (The Academy of Europe). In November 2020, he was elected as a Fellow of the American Association for the Advancement of Science with the citation: For distinguished contributions to the field of nonlinear dynamics and chaos, particularly in relativistic quantum chaos and transient chaos.

== Books ==
- Ying-Cheng Lai and Tamas Tel Transient Chaos: complex dynamics in finite time scales, Springer.
- Ying-Cheng Lai. Reservoir Computing: Machine Learning Meets Nonlinear Dynamics. World Scientific Publishing, 2026.
