= Ronald Adrian =

American engineer and physicist

- Education: Churchill College, Cambridge
- Awards: Fluid Dynamics Prize (APS) (2005)
- Scientific career
- Fields: Engineering and Physics
- Workplaces: University of Illinois; Arizona State University
- Doctoral students: Kendra Sharp

Ronald J. Adrian is the Ira A. Fulton Professor of Mechanical and Aerospace Engineering at Arizona State University's Fulton School of Engineering and heads the Laboratory for Energetic Flow and Turbulence. He is well known for his contributions to the field of fluid dynamics in the areas of wall turbulence, thermal convection, coherent structures in turbulence and laser instrumentation. He is the Associate editor of the Journal of Fluid Mechanics, Co-editor of the Springer Series in Experimental Fluid Mechanics and Co-founder and editor of eFluids.com.
