= William J. Wepfer =

William J. Wepfer is an American mechanical engineer.

== Education and career ==
Wepfer earned a bachelor's degree from Marquette University in 1974, followed by a master's degree at Stanford University in 1976. He then completed doctoral studies at the University of Wisconsin-Madison in 1979, and joined the Georgia Tech faculty as an assistant professor in 1980. Within Georgia Tech's George W. Woodruff School of Mechanical Engineering, Wepfer held the Eugene C. Gwaltney Jr. School Chair. In 2018, he retired from Georgia Tech and was granted emeritus status. During the 2020–2021 term, Wepfer served as president-elect of ABET.

== Awards and honors ==
Wepfer was elected a fellow of the American Society of Mechanical Engineers in 1998. He is the 2015 recipient of the ASME's Edwin F. Church Medal.
