= Sethuraman Panchanathan =

Indian–American computer engineer

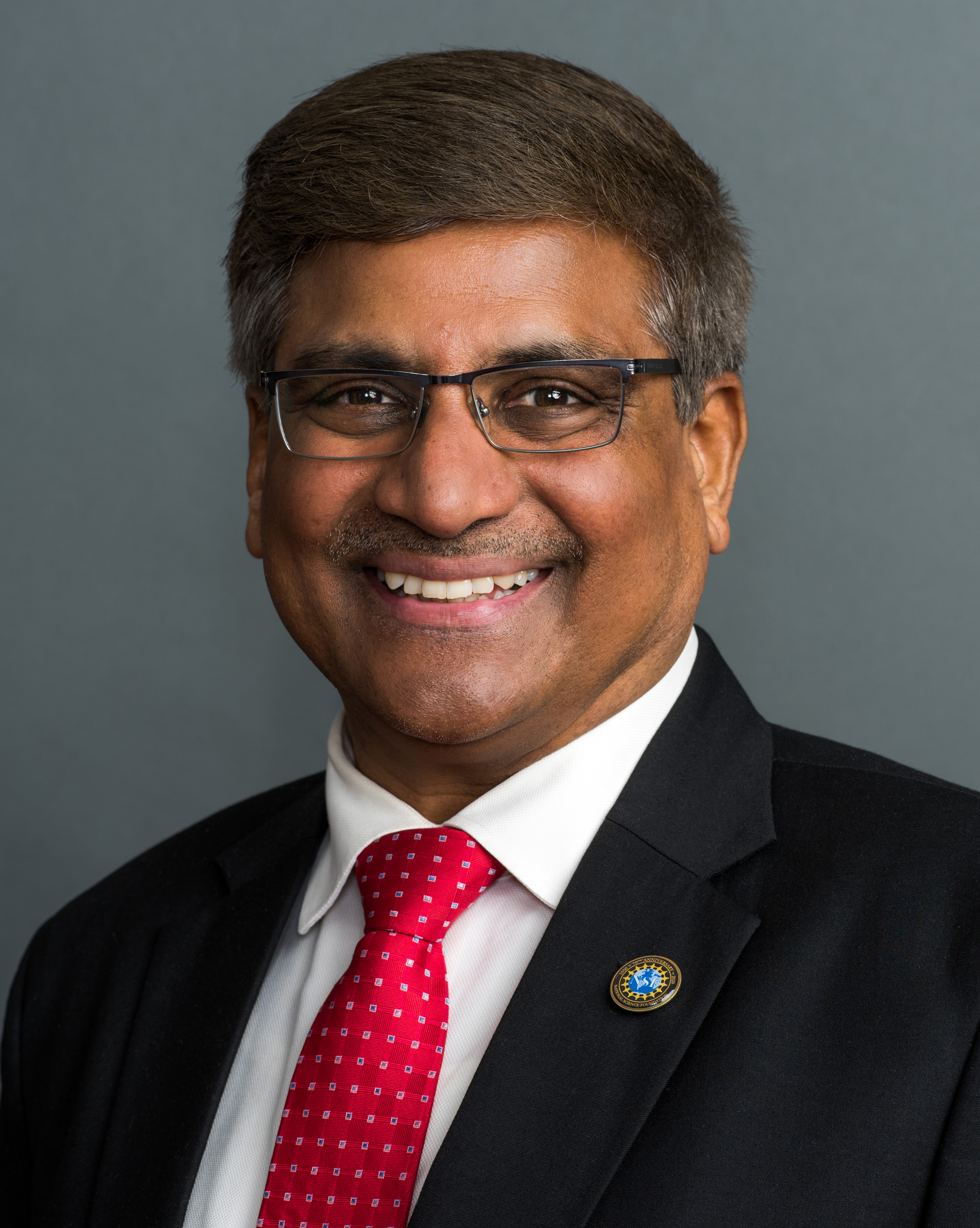
- Panchanathan in 2020

15th Director of the National Science Foundation
- In office June 23, 2020 – April 24, 2025
- President: Donald Trump; Joe Biden; Donald Trump
- Preceded by: Kelvin Droegemeier (acting)
- Succeeded by: Brian Stone (acting)

Personal details
- Born: 24 June 1961 (age 65) Chennai, India
- Education: University of Madras (BS); Indian Institute of Science (BEng); Indian Institute of Technology (MTech); University of Ottawa (PhD)
- Scientific career
- Fields: Electrical engineering; Computer engineering; Informatics
- Workplaces: University of Ottawa; Arizona State University
- Thesis: Algorithms and Architectures for Image Coding Using Vector Quantization (1989)
- Doctoral advisor: Morris Goldberg

Sethuraman Panchanathan (born 24 June 1961) is an Indian–American computer scientist and academic administrator who served as the 15th Director of the U.S. National Science Foundation (NSF) from 2020 to 2025.

Panchanathan is a professor and foundation chair in the School of Computing and Augmented Intelligence, part of the Ira A. Fulton Schools of Engineering at Arizona State University (ASU). Prior to serving on the National Science Board and as NSF director, Panchanathan led ASU's Knowledge Enterprise, its research apparatus, as executive vice president and chief research and innovation officer. During his tenure at the NSF, the agency formed its first new directorate in more than 30 years and established a network of artificial intelligence research institutes, among other initiatives. His departure from the foundation came amid significant cuts to NSF funding.

Panchanathan's research focuses on machine learning and assistive computing technologies for disabled people. In 2025, Panchanathan received the Padma Shri, one of the Government of India's highest civilian awards.

== Early life and education ==
Panchanathan was born in Chennai, India. He attended Vivekananda College, affiliated with the University of Madras, graduating in 1981 with a Bachelor of Science in physics. In 1984, he earned a Bachelor of Engineering in electronics and communication engineering from the Indian Institute of Science in Bangalore.

In 1986, he completed his Master of Technology in electrical engineering from the Indian Institute of Technology Madras. He later enrolled in the doctoral program at the University of Ottawa and received his Ph.D. in electrical and computer engineering in 1989 while working under the direction of Morris Goldberg.

== Career ==
=== University of Ottawa ===
Panchanathan joined the University of Ottawa in 1989 as assistant professor and in 1994 was promoted to associate professor with tenure. While at the university, he was the founding director of the Visual Computing and Communications Laboratory. Research Panchanathan conducted while at the University of Ottawa included work on image and video compression using the JPEG and MPEG standards.

=== Arizona State University ===
In 1997, Panchanathan joined Arizona State University (ASU) in Tempe, Arizona, as a tenured associate professor in the Department of Computer Science and Engineering. In 2001, he was promoted to full professor and founded the Center for Cognitive Ubiquitous Computing (CUbiC); that same year, he became an IEEE fellow for his contributions to compressed domain processing and indexing in visual computing and communications. He also founded and led the School of Computing and Informatics (2006-2009) and the Department of Biomedical Informatics (2005-2007). Panchanathan served as one of ASU's representatives during the creation of the University of Arizona College of Medicine – Phoenix.

Panchanathan was appointed ASU's chief research officer in 2009 and in 2011 was promoted to senior vice president of ASU's Office of Knowledge Enterprise Development, its research apparatus. In 2016, Panchanathan became executive vice president of Knowledge Enterprise development and chief research and innovation officer, a position involving promoting research, entrepreneurship, and strategic partnerships. During his term in the position, research expenditures increased to $635 million in 2018. He served in this role until his nomination as Director of the National Science Foundation in 2020.

=== U.S. National Science Foundation ===
On June 13, 2014, President Barack Obama nominated Panchanathan to the National Science Board of the U.S. National Science Foundation (NSF). President Donald Trump nominated Panchanathan as NSF director on December 19, 2019; the U.S. Senate unanimously confirmed the appointment on June 18, 2020, and he assumed office on June 23.

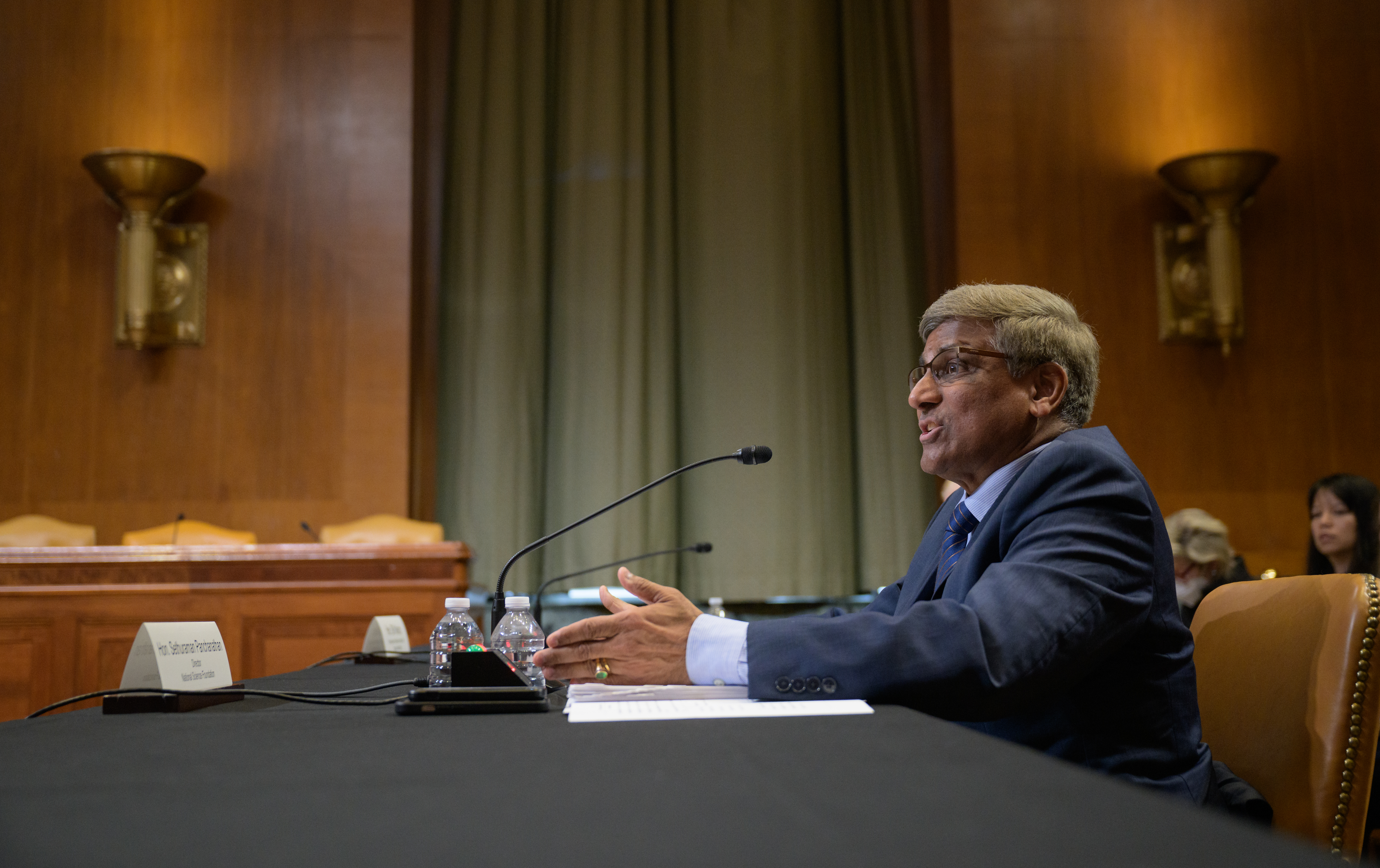
Panchanathan testifying before the United States Senate Appropriations Subcommittee on Commerce, Justice, Science, and Related Agencies in 2024

Panchanathan led the formation and 2022 launch of the Directorate for Technology, Innovation and Partnerships (TIP), the first new directorate developed by the NSF in more than 30 years. Among TIP's programs was Regional Innovation Engines, which was designed to expand the geography of place-based innovation. Other notable achievements during his tenure include a new GRANTED program to broaden participation in research and education, the establishment of a network of 27 artificial intelligence research institutes, and the creation of the Global Centers Program to support "large-scale use-inspired research in collaboration with international partners to address global challenges that cannot be solved by any single country".

As part of mass layoffs in the U.S. federal workforce, on February 4, 2025, 168 NSF workers, representing approximately 10% of the workforce, were fired. Panchanathan's absence from the firing meetings was criticized by some NSF employees. All but two of the 86 probationary employees were rehired on February 28, though a separate group of part-time scientific experts was not, for a total of 84 dismissals.

Panchanathan resigned as director on April 24, 2025, stating, "I believe I have done all I can to advance the critical mission of the agency and feel that it is time for me to pass the baton to new leadership." A source with knowledge of the situation told Science that Panchanathan had "[tried] so hard to present the agency in a positive light" but risked alienating himself from the scientific community had he stayed, given a recent White House proposal to cut the agency's budget by 55% for the next fiscal year.

== Research ==
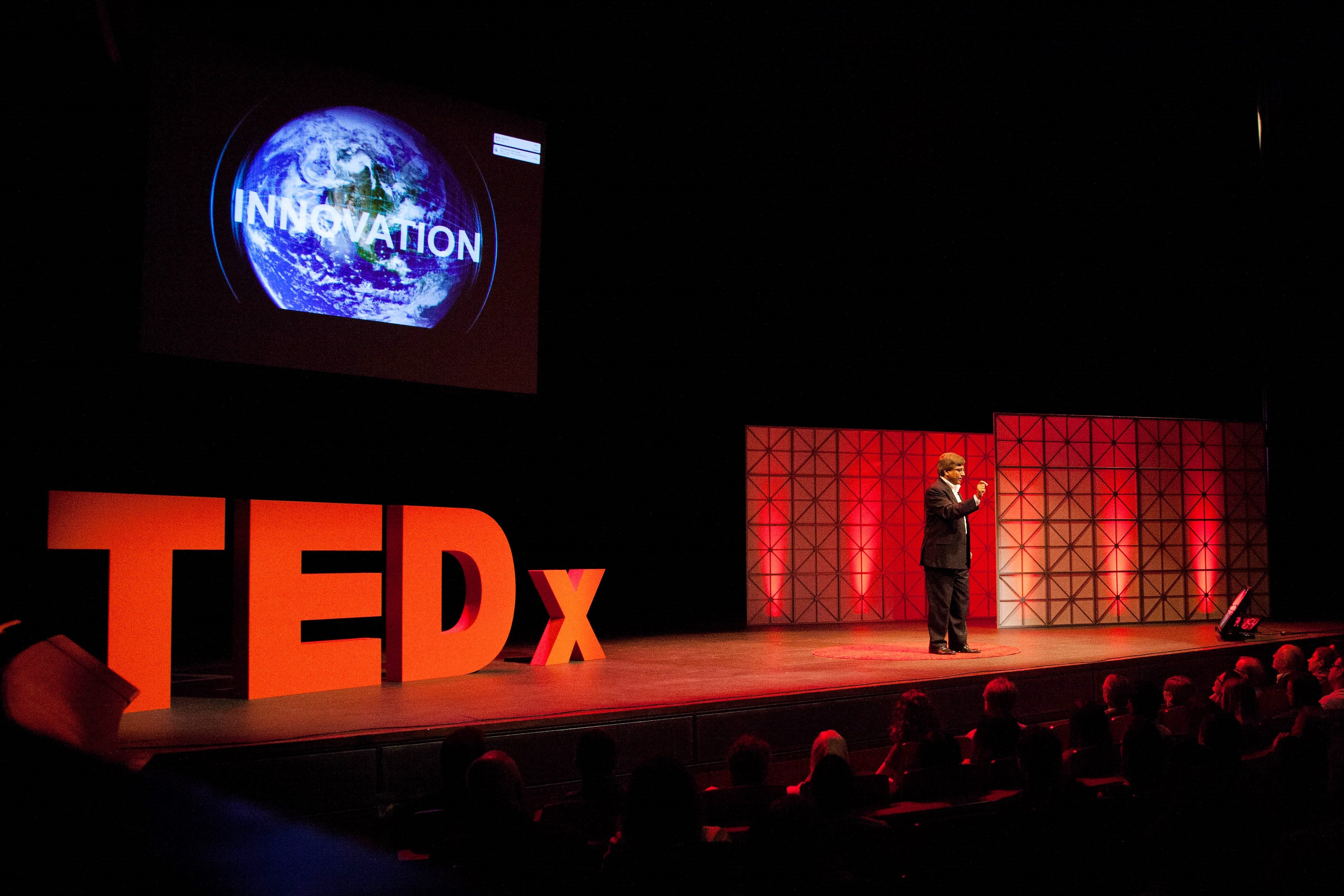
Panchanathan presenting at TEDxASU in Tempe in 2017

Panchanathan's research interests include human-centered multimedia computing (HCMC), assistive and rehabilitative technologies, haptic user interfaces, face and gait analysis and recognition, medical image processing, media processor designs, ubiquitous computing environments for enhancing quality of life for individuals with disabilities, and machine learning.

== Personal life ==
Panchanathan is married and has two children and three grandchildren.

== Awards, appointments and fellowships ==
=== Awards and recognitions ===
- Padma Shri, Government of India, 2025
- Distinguished Career Award in Computer Science and Policy, Washington Academy of Sciences, 2022
- IEEE-USA Award for Distinguished Public Service, Institute of Electrical and Electronics Engineers (IEEE)-USA, 2021
- COO of the Year, Phoenix Business Journal, 2017
- Governor's Innovator of the Year for Academia Award: Governor's Celebration of Innovation Awards for iCARE (Information Technology Centric Assistive and Rehabilitative Environments) for Individuals who are Blind and Visually Impaired, Center for Cognitive Ubiquitous Computing, 2004

=== Appointments ===
- Elected member, National Academy of Engineering, 2024
- Advisor for Science and Technology to Doug Ducey, the Governor of Arizona, 2018–2020
- Vice President of Strategic Initiatives and Membership, National Academy of Inventors Board of Directors, 2018–2020
- Oak Ridge Associated Universities Board of Directors, 2018
- National Academy of Inventors Board of Directors, 2015–present

=== Fellowships ===
Panchanathan is a fellow of the American Association for the Advancement of Science, Association for Computing Machinery, Canadian Academy of Engineering, Institute of Electrical and Electronics Engineers, National Academy of Inventors, and SPIE.

== Published works ==
- Venkateswara, H.; Panchanathan, S., eds. (2020). Domain Adaptation in Computer Vision with Deep Learning. Springer International Publishing. ISBN 978-3-030-45529-3.
- McDaniel, T.; Panchanathan, S., eds. (2019). Haptic Interfaces for Accessibility, Health, and Enhanced Quality of Life. Springer International Publishing. ISBN 978-3-030-34230-2.
- Panchanathan, S.; Chakraborty, S.; McDaniel, T.; Tadayon, R.; Fakhri, B.; O'Connor, N.; Marsden, M.; Little, S.; McGuinness, K.; Monaghan, D. (2017). "Enriching the Fan Experience in a Smart Stadium Using Internet of Things Technologies". International Journal of Semantic Computing. 11 (2): 137–170. doi:10.1142/S1793351X17400062. S2CID 34151501.
- Panchanathan, S.; Chakraborty, S.; McDaniel, T.; Tadayon, R. (August 2016). "Person-Centered Multimedia Computing: A New Paradigm Inspired by Assistive and Rehabilitative Applications". IEEE MultiMedia. 23 (3): 12–19. Bibcode:2016IEEEM..23c..12H. doi:10.1109/MMUL.2016.51.
- Panchanathan, S.; Chakraborty, S.; McDaniel, T. (2016). "Social Interaction Assistant: A Person-Centered Approach to Enrich Social Interactions for Individuals With Visual Impairments". IEEE Journal of Selected Topics in Signal Processing. 10 (5): 942–951. Bibcode:2016ISTSP..10..942P. doi:10.1109/JSTSP.2016.2543681.
- Panchanathan, S.; McDaniel, T. (2014). "Person-centered accessible technologies and computing solutions through interdisciplinary and integrated perspectives from disability research". Universal Access in the Information Society. 14 (3): 415–426. doi:10.1007/s10209-014-0369-9.
- Panchanathan, S.; McDaniel, T.; Balasubramanian, V. (2013). "An interdisciplinary approach to the design, development and deployment of person-centered accessible technologies". 2013 International Conference on Recent Trends in Information Technology (ICRTIT). pp. 750–757. doi:10.1109/ICRTIT.2013.6844294. ISBN 978-1-4799-1024-3.
- Panchanathan, S.; McDaniel, T.; Balasubramanian, V. (2012). "Person-centered accessible technologies: Improved usability and adaptation through inspirations from disability research". Proceedings of the 2012 ACM workshop on User experience in e-learning and augmented technologies in education. pp. 1–6. doi:10.1145/2390895.2390897. ISBN 978-1-4503-1593-7.
- Panchanathan, S.; Krishnan, N.; Krishna, S.; McDaniel, T.; Balasubramanian, V. (2008). "Enriched human-centered multimedia computing through inspirations from disabilities and deficit-centered computing solutions". Proceedings of the 3rd ACM international workshop on Human-centered computing. pp. 35–42. doi:10.1145/1462027.1462033. ISBN 978-1-60558-320-4.

Government offices
Preceded by Kelvin Droegemeier; Acting	Director of the National Science Foundation; 2020–2025	Succeeded by Brian Stone; Acting
