= Nathan Newman (writer) =

British writer

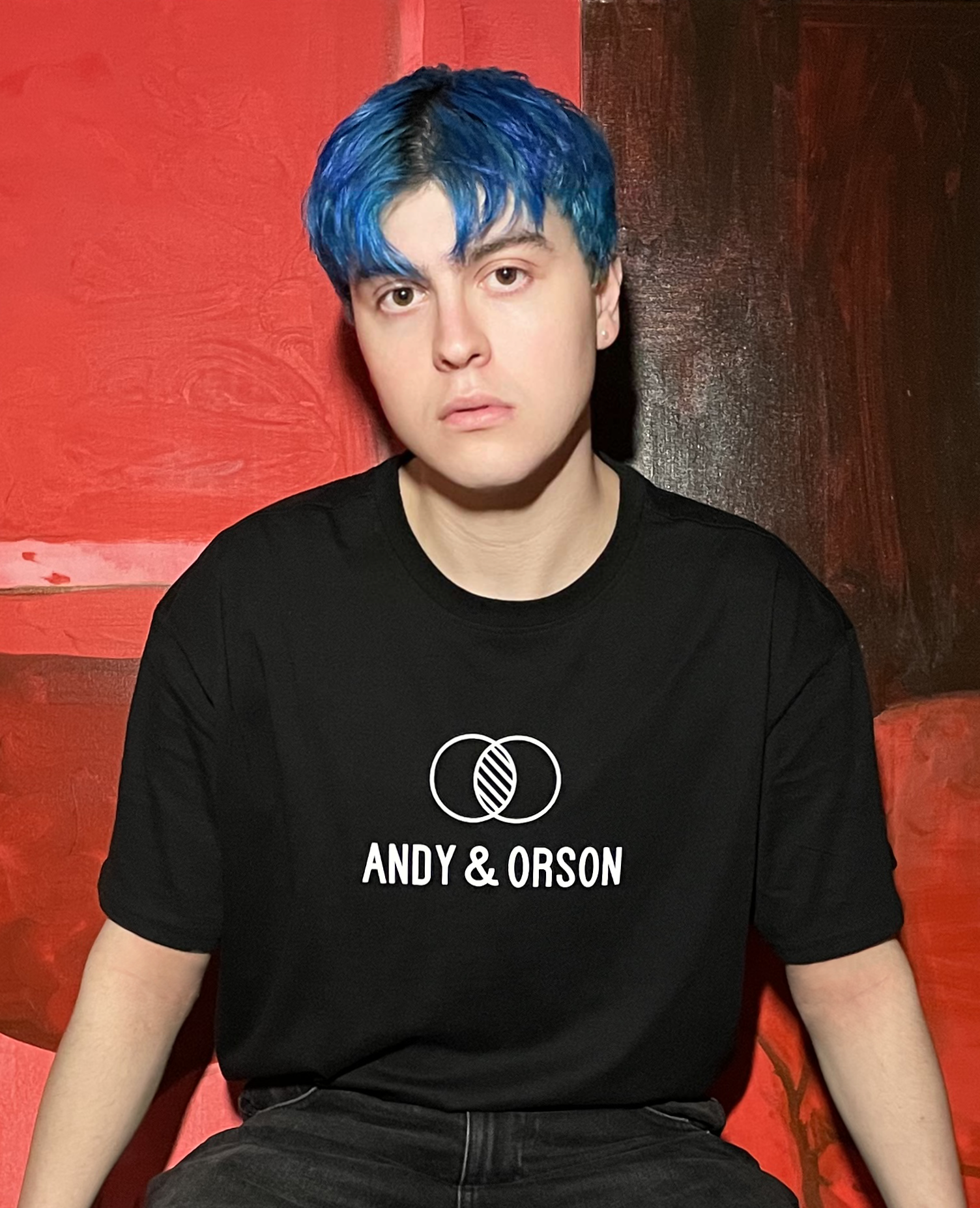
- Newman in 2024
- Education: University of Warwick
- Occupations: Novelist; filmmaker
- Writing career
- Notable work: How to Leave the House (2024)

Nathan Newman is an English author, screenwriter and filmmaker. Their debut novel, How to Leave the House, was released in 2024. Newman co-wrote and directed the upcoming feature film Andy & Orson with Arnold T. Rice, marking Newman's directorial debut.

== Early life and education ==
Newman studied Film and Literature at the University of Warwick in Coventry. They went on to study creative writing by attending New York University remotely, dropping out after one semester.

== Writing ==
Newman's debut novel, How to Leave the House, was published on 2 May 2024 by Little Brown in the UK and Viking Penguin in the US. It was selected by The New Yorker for its "Best Books of 2024" list. It was described by The New York Times as a "profound – and profoundly sidesplitting – debut" and by Financial Times as "a wild and funny ride through modern life as seen through a prism of porn and gender theory". The novel was also featured in The Washington Post and NPR. The television rights were acquired by Fremantle following a competitive auction, with Newman set to executive produce and write all the episodes.

== Film ==
In September 2026, it was announced Newman and Arnold T. Rice would write and direct the coming-of-age film Andy & Orson, with Louis Partridge and Anson Boon attached to star. In November 2026, Olive Gray, Spencer Jones, Kate Ashfield and Lee Ingleby joined the cast. Principal photography took place across South London and the Peak District.

== Personal life ==
Newman is non-binary and uses they/them pronouns. They previously worked in a cinema in Battersea, and now live in South London.
