= Nathan Newman (engineer) =

Engineering professor

Nathan Newman is an engineering professor who is Lamonte H. Lawrence Chair in Solid State Science, School for Engineering of Matter, Transport and Energy at Arizona State University in Tempe, Arizona.

He earned his BS from the University of Southern California in 1981 and his PhD from Stanford University in 1987. According to his official ASU biography, "His research interests include the growth, characterization and modeling of novel solid-state materials for microwave, photonic, and high-speed applications."

He was named a fellow of the American Physical Society in 2006. He received the Van Duzer best paper award of the IEEE Transactions on Applied Superconductivity the same year.

The IEEE Council on Superconductivity named Newman a Fellow of the Institute of Electrical and Electronics Engineers in 2014.

In 2017, at the request of the ASU Art Museum, Newman curated an exhibition called "Material Beauty" that focused on connections between art and science.

In 2018, The National Academy of Inventors named Newman, who holds 13 patents, as one of its fellows.

Newman also directs a program called "SCience and ENgineering Experience" (SCENE), where Phoenix-area high-school students collaborate on research with ASU professors and grad students.
