= Jerry Lin =

Professor Jerry Lin at ASU

Dr. Jerry Y.S. Lin is a Regents' Professor of Chemical Engineering in School for Engineering of Matter, Transport and Energy at the Arizona State University in Tempe, Arizona, US. He publishes papers under the names “Y.S. Lin” or "Jerry Y.S. Lin". From 2006 to 2009, he served as the Chemical Engineering Department Chair at Arizona State University, and now directs the Membrane and Energy Laboratory at ASU.

== Career ==
Dr. Lin is co-Editor-in-Chief for the Journal of Membrane Science, and the founding co-Editor-in-Chief of Journal of Membrane Science Letters. He was Cheung Kong Distinguished Guest Professor of Industrial Catalysis at Tianjin University, Guangbiao Distinguished Guest Professor of Chemical Engineering at Zhejiang University, Piercy Distinguished Visiting professor at the University of Minnesota, and JSPS visiting professor at the University of Tokyo.

Dr. Lin works in the field of inorganic membrane science, separation technologies and energy storage. As of 2019, he has published over 310 papers in chemical engineering and material science journals, and holds nine patents, and his papers have received over 28000 [google scholar citation, with h-index of 81). Lin has been a technical consultant for membrane, chemical, petroleum and energy utility companies.

Lin received his B.S. (1982) from Zhejiang University in China, M.S. (1985) and his Ph.D. (1988) from Worcester Polytechnic Institute in the US, all in chemical engineering. He was a post-doctoral staff member at the University of Twente in the Netherlands (1988–1991). He joined the faculty of chemical engineering at University of Cincinnati as an assistant professor in 1991 and was promoted to full professor in 1998, where he was co-director of the National Science Foundation Center for Membrane Applied Science and Technology. He joined ASU in January 2005 after serving at the University of Cincinnati.

== Awards ==
- NSF Career Award (1995)
- Cheung Kong Scholar (2001)
- AIChE Institute Award for Excellence in Industrial Gases Technology (2009) for "his sustained fundamental research in advancing inorganic membrane science for gas separations, and pioneering work on high temperature adsorption separation technologies"
- Fellow of American Association for the Advancement of Science (AAAS) (2009)
- Regents’ Professor, Arizona State University (2012)
- Fellow of American Institute of Chemical Engineers (AIChE) (2013)
- Fellow of North American Membrane Society (NAMS)(2020)
- AIChE Gerhold Award (2021)
- Lifetime Achievement Award (2026) International Conference on Inorganic Membranes (ICIM) (June 28-July 3, 2026, Montpellier, France)

Lin co-chaired the 2013 and 1998 North American Membranethe Society Annual Meetings, 1994 MRS Symposium on Materials for Separation Technology, and 2001 ACS Symposium on Advanced Membrane Materials. He was the conference chairman of the 2004 International Conference on Inorganic Membranes and chair of the 2010 Gordon Research Conference on Membrane Materials and Processes.
