= American Society of Mechanical Engineers =

Mechanical engineering professional society

ASME
- Formation: 1880; 146 years ago
- Type: Not-for-profit membership organization
- Headquarters: New York City, U.S.
- Location(s): Two Park Avenue; New York; NY 10016-5990; United States
- Region served: Worldwide
- Members: 85,000+ in over 150 countries
- Official language: English
- President: Janis Terpenny
- Immediate Past President: Lester K. Su
- Executive Director: Thomas Costabile
- Affiliations: AIChE; Engineering for Change
- Website: www.asme.org

The American Society of Mechanical Engineers (ASME) is an American professional association that, in its own words, "promotes the art, science, and practice of multidisciplinary engineering and allied sciences around the globe" via "continuing education, training and professional development, codes and standards, research, conferences and publications, government relations, and other forms of outreach." ASME is thus an engineering society, a standards organization, a research and development organization, an advocacy organization, a provider of training and education, and a nonprofit organization. Founded as an engineering society focused on mechanical engineering in North America, ASME is today multidisciplinary and global.

ASME has over 85,000 members in more than 135 countries worldwide.

ASME was founded in 1880 in response to numerous steam boiler pressure vessel failures by Alexander Lyman Holley, Henry Rossiter Worthington, John Edison Sweet and Matthias N. Forney, with Robert Henry Thurston as the society's founding president. Known for setting codes and standards for mechanical devices, ASME conducts one of the world's largest technical publishing operations. It holds numerous technical conferences and hundreds of professional development courses each year and sponsors numerous outreach and educational programs.

Kate Gleason and Lydia Weld were the first two women members, both by 1920.

== Codes and standards ==
ASME is one of the oldest standards-developing organizations in America. It produces approximately 600 codes and standards covering many technical areas, such as fasteners, plumbing fixtures, elevators, pipelines, and power plant systems and components. ASME's standards are developed by committees of subject matter experts using an open, consensus-based process. Many ASME standards are cited by government agencies as tools to meet their regulatory objectives. ASME standards are therefore voluntary, unless the standards have been incorporated into a legally binding business contract or incorporated into regulations enforced by an authority having jurisdiction, such as a federal, state, or local government agency. ASME's standards are used in more than 100 countries and have been translated into numerous languages.

== Boiler and pressure vessel code ==
The largest ASME standard, both in size and in the number of volunteers involved in its preparation, is the ASME Boiler and Pressure Vessel Code (BPVC). The BPVC provides rules for the design, fabrication, installation, inspection, care, and use of boilers, pressure vessels, and nuclear components. The code also includes standards on materials, welding and brazing procedures and qualifications, nondestructive examination, and nuclear in-service inspection.

== Other notable standardization areas ==
Other Notable Standardization Areas include but not limited to are; Elevators and Escalators (A17 Series), Overhead and Mobile Cranes and related lifting and rigging equipment (B30 Series), Piping and Pipelines (B31 Series), Bio-processing Equipment (BPE), Valves Flanges, Fittings and Gaskets (B16), Nuclear Components and Processes Performance Test Codes.

== Publications ==
=== Journals ===
The journals published by ASME include:

- Applied Mechanics Reviews
- Journal of Applied Mechanics
- Journal of Biomechanical Engineering
- Journal of Computational and Nonlinear Dynamics
- Journal of Dynamic Systems Measurement & Control
- Journal of Fluids Engineering
- Journal of Heat Transfer
- Journal of Risk and Uncertainty in Engineering Systems

=== Magazine ===
In addition to academic journals, since 1880 the ASME has also published the magazine Mechanical Engineering.

== ASME awards and recognition ==
ASME offers several categories of awards, including: achievement awards to recognize "those who have made significant achievements in various engineering disciples"; literature awards for original papers; service awards for voluntary service to ASME; and unit awards from ASME groups, sections, or committees.

Among ASME's honors and awards, several have been conferred for more than a century. They begin with Honorary Membership—which ASME also regards as its highest grade of membership—and include the following:

- Honorary Member (1880): ASME's highest level of membership, granted by the Board of Governors for "distinguished service that contributes significantly to the attainment of the goals of the engineering profession." Fewer than 100 living people are honorary members.
- ASME Medal (1920): for "eminently distinguished engineering achievement."
- Holley Medal (1924)
- Robert Henry Thurston Lecture Award (1925)
- Charles T. Main Student Leadership Award (1925)
- Melville Medal (1927)
- Henry Laurence Gantt Medal (1929)
- Worcester Reed Warner Medal (1930)
- George Westinghouse Medal (1952 and 1971)
- Lewis F. Moody Award (1958)
- R. Tom Sawyer Award (1972)
- Ralph Coats Roe Medal (1972)
- Edwin F. Church Medal (1972)
- Nadai Medal (1975)
- Leonardo Da Vinci Award (1978)
- Soichiro Honda Medal (1983)
- Duane P. Jordan Early Career Award (1994)
- Sia Nemat-Nasser Early Career Award (2008)
- Kate Gleason Award (2011)

=== Edwin F. Church Medal ===
The ASME established The Edwin F. Church Medal in 1972. Every year it is awarded to "an individual who has rendered eminent service in increasing the value, importance and attractiveness of mechanical engineering education." The ASME intends the Medal to represent Education in a very broad sense: This includes any aspect of mechanical engineering communicate via universities, technical institutes, professional society educational activities, continuing education programs of professional societies and private groups, in-house professional development programs of industrial concerns and governmental agencies, programmed learning and self-instruction systems. This means the nominees need not be professional educators. A bequest from Edwin F. Church, Jr. (1879–1964), an ASME Member and professor of mechanical engineering and head of the department at the Polytechnic Institute of Brooklyn, established the Medal. Recipients include:

- 1973. Wilbur R. Leopold
- 1974. Hobart A. Weaver
- 1975. Harry Conn
- 1976. Frank W. Von Flue
- 1977. not awarded
- 1978. not awarded
- 1979. Kenneth A. Roe
- 1980. Dennis K. Bushnell
- 1981. Neal P. Jeffries
- 1982. Clinton H. Britt
- 1983. not awarded
- 1984. Milo Price
- 1985. Emil L. Martinec
- 1986. not awarded
- 1987. Garland H. Duncan
- 1988. Dale E. Klein
- 1989. Adolph T. Molin
- 1990. James R. Welty
- 1991. Joseph A. Falcon
- 1992. Stephen Juhasz
- 1993. Larry C. Oyen
- 1994. Avram Bar-Cohen
- 1995. not awarded
- 1996. not awarded
- 1997. Dean Kamen
- 1998. Allan D. Kraus
- 1999. Woodie C. Flowers
- 2000. John H. Lienhard
- 2001. Frank Kreith
- 2002. William S. Hammack
- 2003. Devendra P. Garg
- 2004. David Lavery
- 2005. Vincent Wilczynski
- 2006. not awarded
- 2007. not awarded
- 2008. not awarded
- 2009. Wilbur J. Marner
- 2010. not awarded
- 2011. Ramesh K. Agarwal
- 2012. Kenneth S. Ball
- 2013. William M. Worek
- 2014. John W. Cipolla
- 2015. William J. Wepfer
- 2016. Karen Thole
- 2017. Francis A. Kulacki
- 2018. Kendra V. Sharp
- 2019. Andreas Polycarpou
- 2020. Nael Barakat
- 2021. Efstathios E. Michaelides
- 2022. Suvranu De
- 2023. Volker Sick
- 2024. Oscar Barton Jr.

=== Nadai Medal recipients ===
- Satya N. Atluri (2012)
- Huseyin Sehitoglu (2007)
- George Z. Voyiadjis (2022)

=== ASME Fellows ===
ASME Fellow is a Membership Grade of Distinction conferred by The ASME Committee of Past Presidents to an ASME member with significant publications or innovations and distinguished scientific and engineering background. Over 3,000 members have attained the grade of Fellow. The ASME Fellow membership grade is the highest elected grade in ASME.

== E-Fests ==
ASME runs several annual E-Fests, or Engineering Festivals, taking the place of the Student Professional Development Conference (SPDC) series. In addition to the Human Powered Vehicle Challenge (HPVC), the Innovative Additive Manufacturing 3D Challenge (IAM3D), the Student Design Competition, and the Old Guard Competition, there are also talks, interactive workshops, and entertainment. These events allows students to network with working engineers, host contests, and promote ASME's benefits to students as well as professionals. E-Fests are held in four regions in the United States and internationally—western U.S., eastern U.S., Asia Pacific, and South America—with the E-Fest location for each region changing every year.

== Student competitions ==
ASME holds a variety of competitions every year for engineering students from around the world.

- Human Powered Vehicle Challenge (HPVC)
- Student Design Competition (SDC)
- Innovative Design Simulation Challenge (IDSC)
- Innovative Additive Manufacturing 3D Challenge (IAM3D)
- Old Guard Competitions
- Innovation Showcase (IShow)
- Student Design Expositions

== Organization ==
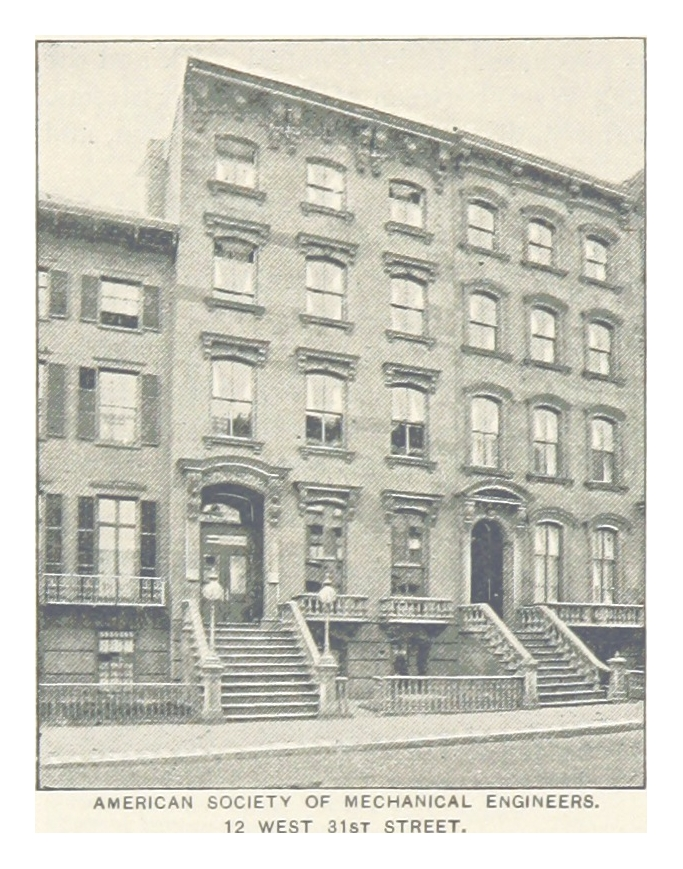
AMERICAN SOCIETY OF MECHANICAL ENGINEERS. 12 WEST 31ST St, 19th century headquarters

ASME has four key offices in the United States, including its headquarters operation in New York, N.Y., and three international offices in Beijing, China; Brussels, Belgium, and New Delhi, India. ASME has two institutes and 32 technical divisions within its organizational structure. Volunteer activity is organized into four sectors:

- Technical Events and Content
- Public Affairs and Outreach
- Standards and Certification
- Student and Early Career Development

== Controversy ==
In 1982, ASME was found to be the first non-profit organization to in violation of the Sherman Antitrust Act. The United States Supreme Court found the organization liable for more than $6 million in American Society of Mechanical Engineers v. Hydrolevel Corp.

== See also ==
- ASME Y14.41-2003 Digital Product Definition Data Practices
- List of American Society of Mechanical Engineers academic journals
- List of Historic Mechanical Engineering Landmarks
- ASME Medal
- ASME Boiler and Pressure Vessel Code
- Uniform Mechanical Code
- American Welding Society
