= Heather J. Lynch =

American statistician

Heather Joan Lynch
- Education: Harvard University; Princeton University
- Awards: LeRoy Apker Award (1994); Blavatnik Awards for Young Scientists (2019)
- Scientific career
- Workplaces: Stony Brook University
- Thesis: Spatiotemporal Dynamics of Insect-Fire Interactions (2006)
- Website: Lynch Lab

Heather Joan Lynch is an associate professor of Ecology and Evolution at Stony Brook University and the first Endowed Chair for Ecology and Evolution at Stony Brook's Institute for Advanced Computational Science. She is a 2019 laureate of the Blavatnik Awards for Young Scientists and a National Geographic Explorer. Lynch uses satellite remote sensing, field work and mathematical models to better understand the population dynamics of the penguins of the Antarctic Peninsula.

== Early life and education ==
Lynch earned her bachelor's degree in physics with a certificate in materials science engineering at Princeton University. She graduated summa cum laude and was awarded the American Physical Society LeRoy Apker Award for her undergraduate research on the Kondo effect. She worked alongside Barbara Cooper and Lydia Sohn. Her research included measurements of spin-polarised currents that tunnel through metallic nanoparticles. She moved to Harvard University for her graduate studies, where she was supported by a Lucent Technologies fellowship. She earned a master's degree in physics but transferred to the Department of Organismal and Evolutionary Biology to complete a doctorate in statistical ecology. She completed her doctoral research on insect-fire interactions under the supervision of Paul Moorcroft in 2006. Lynch joined the laboratory of William Fagan at the University of Maryland, College Park where she applied statistical analysis to big data that described the survivorship of mammals and biodiversity patterns in ecological networks.

== Research and career ==
She moved to the University of California, Santa Cruz, where she taught applied mathematics and statistics. Soon after she joined the faculty at Stony Brook University in 2011 and was awarded a National Science Foundation CAREER Award in 2013. Her research combines mathematics and statistics with conservation biology. She looks to understand the population dynamics and geographic distribution of penguins that breed in the Antarctic Peninsula.

Lynch studies penguins – in particular Antarctic petrels and Adélie penguins, whose migratory patterns can teach us about the global effects of climate change. She studies the spatial and temporal patterns of Adélie penguins, making predictions about their colony sizes using mathematical models and trying to determine the Antarctic ecosystems which allow the birds to thrive. Lynch has led expeditions to the Cape Lookout National Seashore. On a rocky archipelago known as the Danger Islands, Lynch discovered a previously unknown super colony of penguins. She created MAPPPD (Mapping Application for Penguin Populations and Projected Dynamics), an open access platform to share information about penguin population counts.

She is working with the National Science Foundation to develop sophisticated new software to support high-resolution commercial imagery of the North and South Pole. Lynch was named the 2019 life sciences laureate of the Blavatnik Awards for Young Scientists. That year she was elected a National Geographic Explorer.

In 2023, she was named the inaugural director of the Collaborative for the Earth at Stony Brook University, an “action tank” for facilitating university-wide research, education and public/policy engagement on global-scale environmental crises.
