= Lydia Sohn =

American Mechanical and bio-engineer

Lydia Lee Sohn
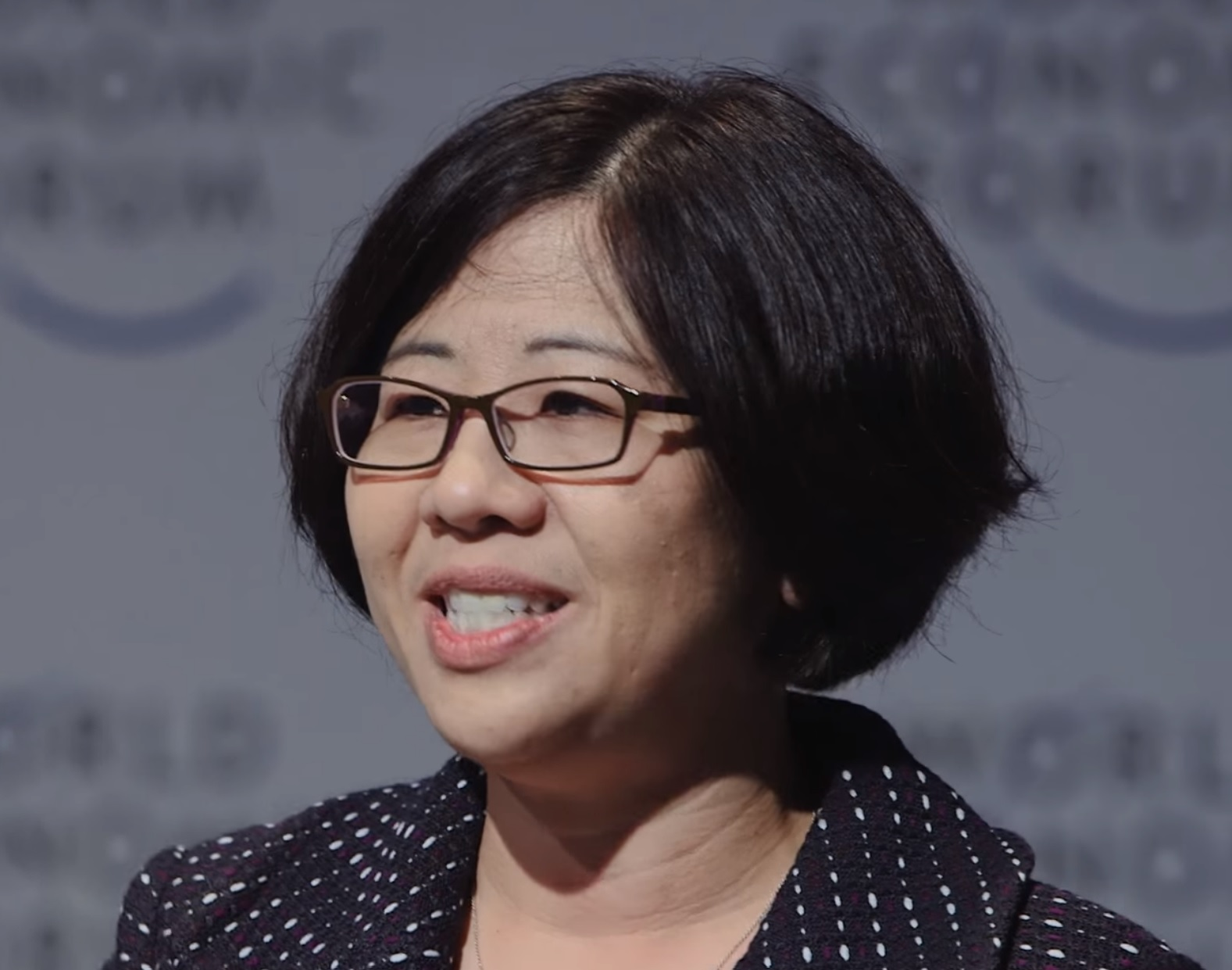
- Lydia Sohn speaks at the World Economic Forum in 2015
- Education: Harvard University
- Scientific career
- Fields: Physics, Mechanical engineering, Bio-engineering
- Workplaces: Harvard University Delft University of Technology; Princeton University; Bell Labs UC Berkeley
- Thesis: Geometrical Effects in Two-Dimensional Arrays of Josephson Junctions (1990)
- Doctoral advisor: Michael Tinkham

Lydia Lee Sohn is a professor of mechanical engineering and bio-engineering at the University of California, Berkeley and the co-founder of Nodexus. In 2002, Sohn and Paul McEuen uncovered figure duplication and fraud in scientific papers on semiconductors written by Jan Hendrik Schön, leading to multiple retractions and concerns over peer-review, which is referred to as the Schön scandal.

== Career ==
Sohn credits her parents, who both worked in science-related fields, as an inspiration for pursuing science; her father would bring home objects from the lab like magnesium, which she would then set on fire. Sohn completed her bachelor's degree in chemistry and physics in 1988 and her master's degree in physics in 1990 at Harvard University. She completed her Ph.D. titled "Geometrical Effects in Two-Dimensional Arrays of Josephson Junctions" in 1992, supervised by Michael Tinkham, also at Harvard University.

She held a NSF/NATO postdoc at Delft University of Technology in 1993. Sohn worked at AT&T's Bell Labs as a postdoc between 1993 and 1995 in the Semiconductor Physics Research Department where she developed new methods of lithography with an atomic force microscope. In 1995 Sohn was appointed assistant professor of physics at Princeton University.

In 2003 Sohn joined UC Berkeley as an assistant professor in the Department of Mechanical Engineering before being appointed associate professor in 2005. Since 2011 Sohn has held the position of faculty assistant to the vice chancellor for research, and in 2015 Sohn was promoted to professor. Sohn held the position of Presidential Chair Fellow at UC Berkeley in 2012–2013 and Baker Fellow between 2013 and 2015.

In 2017, it was announced by the American Institute for Medical and Biological Engineering that Sohn would be inducted into its College of Fellows for "Outstanding contributions to engineering design and measurement science in the biomolecular analysis of cell surface receptors." On March 20, 2017, Sohn was formally inducted as a Fellow of the American Institute for Medical and Biological Engineering.

=== Schön scandal ===
In 2002, a few years after Sohn left Bell Labs, Hendrik Schön joined Bell Labs. Although Schön had acquired "rockstar" status in the research community for work on field-effect transistors, Sohn and her friends felt his data to be "too perfect" with many groups failing to reproduce these potentially Nobel-prize-winning results. The uncovering of Schön's scientific fraud would begin with two researchers, Lynn Loo and Julia Hsu, who noticed a duplication of figures in one of Schön's papers whilst preparing a patent. Around the same time in April 2002, Sohn received a phone call from an informant (who has remained anonymous) asking for Sohn's opinion on two figures, each in separate publications by Schön but both appear to have identical noise.

I just happened to check my voicemail messages in my office and I had a very interesting voicemail message and it said, Lydia, this is your homework, look at these two papers by Hendrik. And by the tone of his voice I knew something very juicy was going on and so I quickly downloaded, these two papers, one from Science and one from Nature.

Sohn spotted that the level of noise, which she describes as "squiggles and bumps", was identical even at different temperatures, which cannot be possible, "...[noise] should never overlap one another, noise simply can't reproduce..." Sohn commented. After discussion with others including Paul McEuen, it was decided that Sohn would inform Nature of this discovery as her acquaintances all had pre-print papers under review at Nature at the time. Sohn informed Nature via a phonecall with Karl Ziemelis. Even before an investigation had begun, Sohn and McEuen would discover the same issue in 6 of Schön's papers, with the two remarking that they had become akin to Mulder and Scully from the fictional TV show X-Files, uncovering the extent of Schön's deception.

I emailed Nature, and then they contacted Schön with our claims. He replied that it was an innocent mistake and that he would provide the relevant data. But as we all worked through more of his results, everyone discovered more and more instances of what looked to be fraudulent data, and everything snowballed from there. When a colleague got in touch with Hendrik Schön himself, his only comment was “how could that be?” Then we sent him the PowerPoint slides presenting our case. We never heard back from him after that.

The investigation by Bell Labs over Schön's work was initiated after being contacted by Sohn and McEuen in May 2002. In September 2002, Bell Labs dismissed Schön after finding him guilty of 16 counts of scientific misconduct out of a total of 25 allegations, including the duplication, falsification and destroying of data. Unfortunately, most of the evidence from Schön's original experiments was damaged or destroyed and further attempts to replicate the transistor behavior have failed. Raw data had been deleted. Upon news of the retraction of 28 of Schön's publications and his firing, Sohn lamented for researchers who had spent time trying to replicate Schön's falsified results, commenting to Nature that she hoped people would learn and move forward from this incident.

Commenting on the aftermath of the Schön scandal, Sohn claims that she lost six months of work, also affecting her graduate student at the time. Despite warnings that she would be an outcast from the research community, Sohn attests that she is "first and foremost a scientist, and I felt that someone can't do this to Mother Nature. I felt good knowing that I had done the right thing."

== Research ==
Sohn develops tools to detect and separate rare cell populations from a mixture of cells and to assay for specific surface receptors. An example is isolating circulating tumor cells which can then be studied to identify the biological markers that determine why some of them become metastatic tumors and therefore spread.

Among her interests is the study of lung cancer diagnosis due to the lack of symptoms and the high cost of testing. Her research aims to bring rapid cost-effective screening to detect tumor-derived exosomes in saliva. The technique uses resistive-pulse sensing to measure the size change of a micron-sized colloid which is coated with an antibody when the tumor-derived exosomes bind to it.

In 2007 Sohn performed a demonstration of her handheld nano-cytometer at the Coalition for National Science Funding Exhibition for leaders of Congress and the National Science Foundation. The nano-cytometer aims to make disease detection easier and cheaper at home by testing a single drop of blood using a disposable cartridge. Each cartridge contains a silicon chip filled with artificial nanopores, mimicking the filtration system of human cells. It was developed in collaboration with Andrea Carbonaro, Haiyun Huang and Lucy Godley to boost the survival rates for leukaemia, prostate-cancer and breast-cancer patients.

During the American Physical Society March meeting in 2012, Sohn showed reporters images of fluorescent markers attached to a biomarker called CCR7 which appears on the surface of breast cancer cells and is associated with lower survival rates. Sohn's group was the first to attempt to image and map the spatial distribution of these markers on the surface of breast cancer cells using a technique called stochastic optical reconstruction microscopy (STORM), originally developed by Xiaowei Zhuang.

In 2014, Sohn developed a new label-free method for screening cells for the phenotypic profile, termed 'node-pore sensing' (NPS), NPS involves measuring a modulated current pulse which is caused by a cell moving through a microchannel segmented by a series of inserted nodes, each segment functionalized with different antibodies. This uses inexpensive microfluidics such that as the blood flows through the channels, its progress and therefore velocity, is slowed depending on if a surface protein encounters a matching antibody. A whole panel of protein biomarkers can be tested rapidly.

Sohn was one of 5 finalists in the international competition Identifying Platform Technologies for Advancing Life Sciences Research competition, awarded by the Burroughs Welcome Fund, The Gordon and Betty Moore Foundation, The John Templeton Foundation, The Kavli Foundation, Research Corporation for Science Advancement, and W. M. Keck Foundation for her entry A low-cost, label-free platform to screen, and subsequently sort, single-cells for multiple surface markers. As part of this award, Sohn met with the White House's Office of Science and Technology Policy and the National Institutes of Health.

A modified version of NPS – 'mechano-NPS' adds a contraction channel between two nodes to measure the cell's size, resistance to deformation, and ability to recover after deformation. Mechano-NPS, developed around 2016 with Sohn's graduate student at the time Junghyun Kim, can distinguish malignant from non-malignant epithelial cells and track malignant progression for early detection of breast cancer as cancerous cells travel more quickly as they are more pliable/elastic. Sohn was surprised that such a fundamental trait as deformation could distinguish cancel cells from normal ones.

Working with Mark LaBarge, Sohn confirmed that mechano-NPS could distinguish between myoepithelial (MEP) and luminal epithelial (LEP) cells which are sub-populations of breast cancer cells but are involved in the cancer's progression as LEP cells, which produce milk, are the cell type that cancer targets. MEP cells on the other hand play a role in ductal contraction and tumor suppression. For Sohn, the importance of reducing the uncertainty of cancer screening is related to her own mother's lung cancer diagnosis.

This is a very real thing to me...I hope I can help women so that if they do get breast cancer at least it can be detected in its very earliest stage. I never want people to go through all the long and arduous tests and treatments. That has motivated me for the past ten years to push for fast cancer diagnosis.

Sohn has adapted her research in cell deformation in collaboration with Grace O'Connell to identify which cells in diseased osteoarthritic tissue can grow into healthy tissue for tissue engineering techniques, potentially reducing the need for surgical repair strategies using artificial joints which are temporary solutions. Diagnosis and sorting are crucial as it takes many months to grow tissue, and only the strongest cartilage can be used to support the weight of the human body. Sohn's work can identify the best cell candidates by testing the cell deformation when passing through thin channels.

On the topic of Sohn's multidisciplinary research, Sohn comments "I think everywhere I’ve gone, I’ve done something very different from the previous time, which is probably not great career-wise. But, for me, it’s all about whether it’s fun or not."

=== Nodexus ===
In 2014 Sohn co-founded Nodexus which aims to commercialize Sohn's research on cell screening.

== Awards and honors ==
- Thomas S. Monfried Scholar, New Jersey Harvard Alumni Association (1985)
- Francis Lee Friedman Physics Award, Harvard-Radcliffe Colleges (1987)
- Rowland Foundation Physics Research Award (1986–1988)
- Office of Naval Research Predoctoral Fellowship (1988–1991)
- National Science Foundation-NATO Postdoctoral Fellowship (1992–1993)
- Wu Foundation Award (1996)
- AT&T and Lucent Technologies Foundation Award (1996)
- DuPont Young Professor Award (1996–1999)
- National Science Foundation Faculty Career Early Development Award (1996–2000)
- Army Research Office Young Investigator Award (1997–2000)
- Sigma Pi Sigma, National Physics Honor Society (2004)
- W. M. Keck Foundation Medical Research Program Award (2010–2013)
- “Identifying Platform Technologies for Advancing Life Sciences Research” competition, awarded by the Burroughs Welcome Fund, The Gordon and Betty Moore Foundation, The John Templeton Foundation, The Kavli Foundation, Research Corporation for Science Advancement, and the W. M. Keck Foundation. Sohn won one of the top 5 prizes for her work on A low-cost, label-free platform to screen, and subsequently sort, single-cells for multiple surface markers. (2014)
- Fellow of the American Institute for Medical and Biological Engineering (2017)
- Chancellor's Professor, UC Berkeley (2019–2020)
- Almy C. Maynard and Agnes Offield Maynard Chair in Mechanical Engineering (2020)
