= SYK =

SYK may refer to:

- Helsingin Suomalainen Yhteiskoulu, middle and high school in Helsinki, Finland
- South Yorkshire, county in England, Chapman code
- Tyrosine-protein kinase SYK, an enzyme
- Sachdev-Ye-Kitaev model
