= Yueh-Lin Loo =

Award-Winning Malaysian-American Chemical Engineer

Yueh-Lin (Lynn) Loo
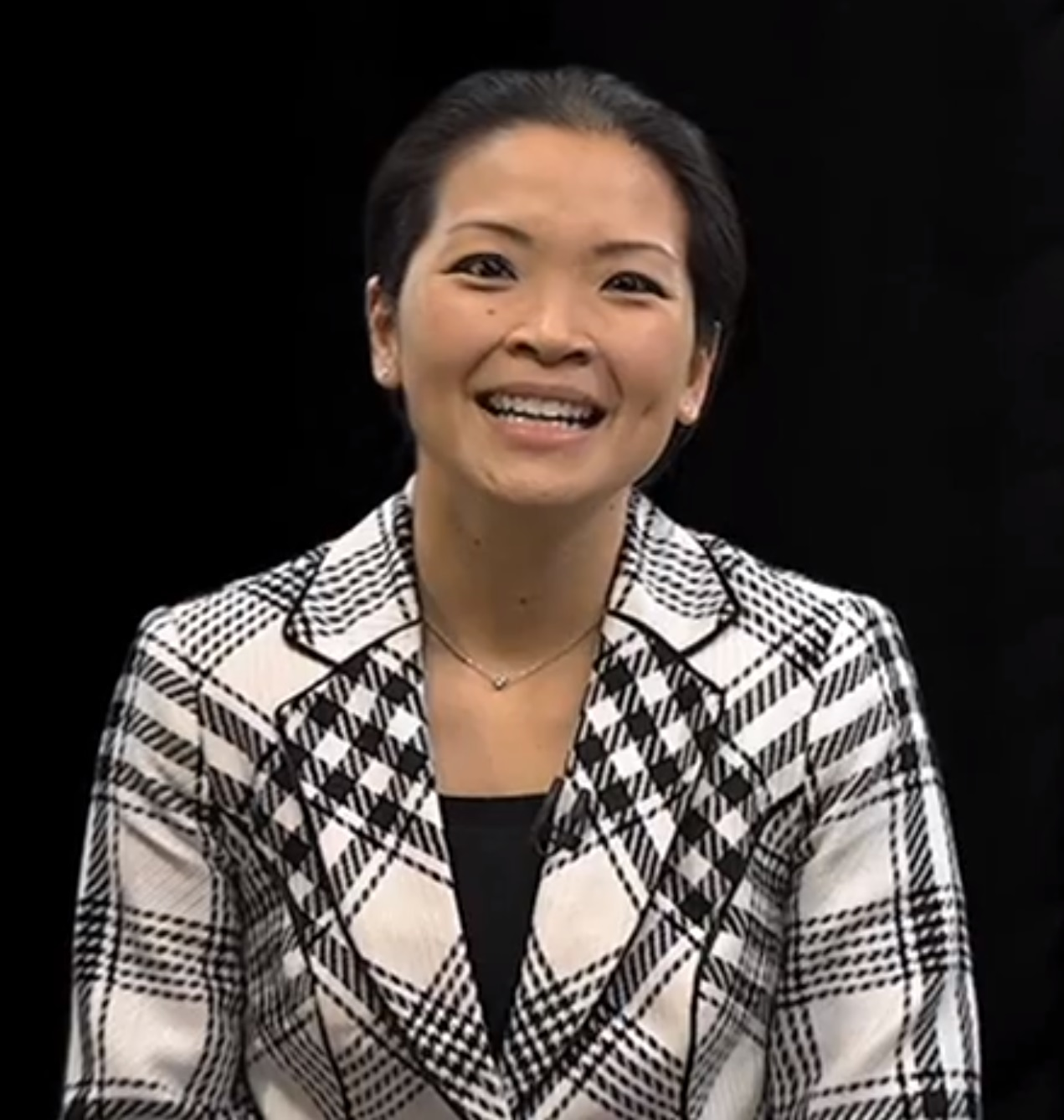
- Lynn Loo speaks at the World Economic Forum in 2012
- Education: University of Pennsylvania; Princeton University
- Known for: Nanotransfer printing
- Scientific career
- Workplaces: Princeton University University of Texas at Austin Bell Laboratories

Yueh-Lin (Lynn) Loo is a Malaysian-born Taiwanese-American chemical engineer and the Theodora D. '78 and William H. Walton III '74 Professor in Engineering at Princeton University, where she is also the Director of the Andlinger Center for Energy and the Environment. She is known for inventing nanotransfer printing. Loo was elected a Fellow of the Materials Research Society in 2020.

== Early life and education ==
Loo was born in Kuala Lumpur, Malaysia, and later lived in Taipei, Taiwan, where she attended Taipei American School. She moved to the United States to attend the University of Pennsylvania, where she completed bachelor's degrees in chemical engineering and materials science in 1996. She then pursued graduate studies at Princeton University, where she received a Ph.D. in chemical engineering in 2001 after completing a doctoral dissertation titled "Controlled polymer crystallization through block copolymer self-assembly."

== Research and career ==
She worked as a postdoctoral researcher at Bell Laboratories for a year afterward before joining the University of Texas at Austin's Chemical Engineering Department. During her time at Bell Labs, Loo, along with Julia Hsu, accidentally uncovered duplicated figures in two papers by Jan Hendrik Schön, the first of many instances of academic fraud from the researcher. In 2004, she was included by MIT Technology Review on its TR35 list of under-35-year-old innovators for her invention of nanotransfer printing, a technique for printing nanoscale patterns onto plastic surfaces. This technique allows for the creation of organic electronic devices by printing electrical circuit components onto plastic surfaces.

In 2007, Loo joined the faculty of Princeton's Chemical and Biological Engineering Department, where, as of 2015, she is the Theodora D. '78 and William H. Walton III '74 Professor in Engineering. Her research concerns the periodic structures of block polymers, organic semiconductors, and patterning techniques for plastic electronics.

Loo launched the Princeton E-ffiliates Partnership (E-ffiliates) in 2012.

In 2016 she was appointed director of Andlinger Center for Energy and the Environment.

Loo's research group studies solution-processable organic semiconductors and conductors. She also researches soft lithography. Using derivatives of Hexabenzocoronene Loo's group developed transparent near-UV solar cells for smart windows, which also contain electrochromic polymers that control the window tint.

Loo co-founded Andluca Technologies in 2017.

== Awards and honors ==
- 2005 Beckman Young Investigators Award
- 2006 O’Donnell Award from the Academy of Medicine, Engineering and Science of Texas
- 2008 Alfred P. Sloan Foundation Fellowship
- 2010 John H. Dillon Medal from the American Physical Society
- 2011 Appointed to the Global Young Academy
- 2012 Owens Corning Early Career Award
- 2013 Elected Fellow of the American Physical Society
- 2015 Finalist for the Blavatnik Awards for Young Scientists National Awards in the Physical Sciences & Engineering category
- 2020 Elected Fellow of the Materials Research Society
- 2025 Member of the National Academy of Engineering
