= Steven H. Simon =

American physicist

- Born: 1967 (age 57–58)
- Education: Brown University (BSc); Harvard University (PhD)
- Scientific career
- Institutions: Bell Labs; Oxford University
- Thesis: Response and Transport in the Quantum Hall Regime (1995)
- Doctoral advisor: Bertrand Halperin

Steven H. Simon (born 1967) is an American theoretical physics professor at Oxford University (since 2009) and professorial fellow of Somerville College, Oxford (since 2016). From 2000 to 2008 he was the director of theoretical physics research at Bell Laboratories. He has served on the UK EPSRC Physical Sciences Strategic Advisory Board. He is known for his work on topological phases of matter, topological quantum computing, and fractional quantum Hall effect. He is a co-author of a highly cited review on these subjects. He has also written many papers in the field of information theory. He is the author of a popular introductory book on solid state physics entitled The Oxford Solid State Basics as well as a more recent book entitled Topological Quantum. He is married to political science professor Janina Dill.

== Education ==
Simon received a bachelor of science in physics and math from Brown University in 1989. He earned a doctorate in physics from Harvard University in 1995. At Harvard, Simon's advisor was Bertrand Halperin, Hollis Chair of Mathematicks and Natural Philosophy. As a postdoctoral researcher he worked with Patrick A. Lee at MIT.

== Awards ==
- 1989 LeRoy Apker Award for outstanding undergraduate achievement from the American Physical Society.
- 2005 Fellow of the American Physical Society for contributions to low-dimensional correlated electron theory, and for scientific leadership in research and applications of condensed matter physics and physics methods, in an industrial setting.
- 2009 ETS Walton Fellow
- 2013 Royal Society Wolfson Research Merit Award
- 2023 Frontiers of Science Award along with S. Parameswaran, Y. Kwan, G. Wagner, N. Bultinck.
