= LeRoy Apker =

American experimental physicist

- Born: June 11, 1915; Rochester, New York
- Died: July 5, 1970 (aged 55); Schenectady, New York
- Education: University of Rochester
- Awards: Oliver E. Buckley Condensed Matter Prize (1955)
- Scientific career
- Fields: Experimental physics
- Workplaces: General Electric Research Laboratory

LeRoy W. Apker (June 11, 1915 – July 5, 1970) was an American experimental physicist. Along with his colleagues E. A. Taft and Jean Dickey, he studied the photoelectric emission of electrons from semiconductors and discovered the phenomenon of exciton-induced photoemission in potassium iodide. In 1955, he received the Oliver E. Buckley Condensed Matter Prize of the American Physical Society for his work.

== Biography ==
Born in Rochester, New York on June 11, 1915, Apker attended the University of Rochester, receiving a Bachelor of Arts degree in 1937. He then commenced graduate studies there under Lee Alvin DuBridge, along with fellow graduate students Ernest Courant, Esther M. Conwell, Robert H. Dicke, and others. He received his Ph.D. in physics in 1941. Also in 1941, he began working for the General Electric Research Laboratory in Schenectady, New York. On July 5, 1970, he was found by his wife, suffering from a gunshot wound to the head on the driveway of his home. He was taken to a hospital in Schenectady, where he later died.

== Research ==
=== Photoelectric effect in semiconductors ===
While at General Electric, he began to research the photoelectric effect, which causes matter to emit electrons when exposed to some types of electromagnetic radiation. In 1916 Robert Andrews Millikan, while verifying the photoelectric equations of Albert Einstein, had proposed the idea that photoelectrons emitted from semiconductors should behave in a different way than those emitted from other types of matter, and a very similar theory was advanced by Edward Condon in 1938.

In 1948 Apker, working with E. A. Taft and J. E. Dickey, he completed experiments that confirmed Condon's theory. The main discovery made was that photoelectrons from some semiconductors moved much slower than photoelectrons from metals with the same work function, an unexpected result which was used to increase understanding of the electronic structure of semiconductors.

=== Flash filament method ===
Apker was also active in the field of vacuum science. In 1948 he developed the flash filament method for measuring very low pressures, which was the first widely used method for measuring pressures less than $10^-8$ Torr. In this method, a gas is allowed to adsorb onto a clean tungsten filament for a set amount of time, and the filament is then rapidly heated. The gas adsorbed onto the filament is released, and the resulting pressure burst can be measured. Though very time-consuming, the flash filament method was later used for thermal desorption spectroscopy.

=== Potassium iodide ===
Apker followed up his work on the photoelectric effect with an investigation of the photoelectric properties of the alkali halides, particularly potassium iodide. In potassium iodide, an ionic crystal, some iodide ions can be removed and their vacant places will be filled by electrons. Called "F-Centers," these defects absorb visible and ultraviolet light, coloring the crystals at photon energies where they are usually transparent. Additionally, the absorption of visible radiation can free trapped electrons inside the crystal and produce photoconductivity.

Apker found that in addition to visible radiation, near-ultraviolet radiation also produces photoconductivity. Deeper into the ultraviolet spectrum, however, potassium iodide has a strong absorption line due to the formation of chargeless particles called excitons. These excitons transfer energy to the electrons in the F-Centers with remarkably high efficiency, and these excited electrons are excited from the crystals in exciton-induced photoemission. Apker observed the same sort of behavior in other crystals such as barium oxide.

== Legacy ==
In 1978, Apker's wife and colleague Jean Dickey Apker established the LeRoy Apker Award of the American Physical Society in memory of Apker. The award is presented to two college undergraduates each year.

== Bibliography ==
- Apker, L.; Taft, E.; Dickey, J. (1948). "Photoelectric Emission and Contact Potentials of Semiconductors". Physical Review. 74 (10): 1462. Bibcode:1948PhRv...74.1462A. doi:10.1103/PhysRev.74.1462.
- Apker, L. (1948). "Surface Phenomena Useful in Vacuum Technique". Industrial and Engineering Chemistry. 40 (5): 846–847. doi:10.1021/ie50461a016.
- Apker, L.; Taft, E. (1950). "Photoelectric Emission from F-Centers in KI". Physical Review. 79 (6): 964. Bibcode:1950PhRv...79..964A. doi:10.1103/PhysRev.79.964.
- Apker, L.; Taft, E. (1951). "Exciton-Enhanced Photoelectric Emission from F-Centers in RbI near 85K". Physical Review. 81 (5): 698–701. Bibcode:1951PhRv...81..698A. doi:10.1103/PhysRev.81.698.
- Apker, L.; Taft, E.; Dickey, J. (1953). "Electron Scattering and the Photoemission from Cesium Antimonide". Journal of the Optical Society of America. 43 (2): 78–80. doi:10.1364/JOSA.43.000078.
