= Dean Lee =

American nuclear theorist, researcher and educator

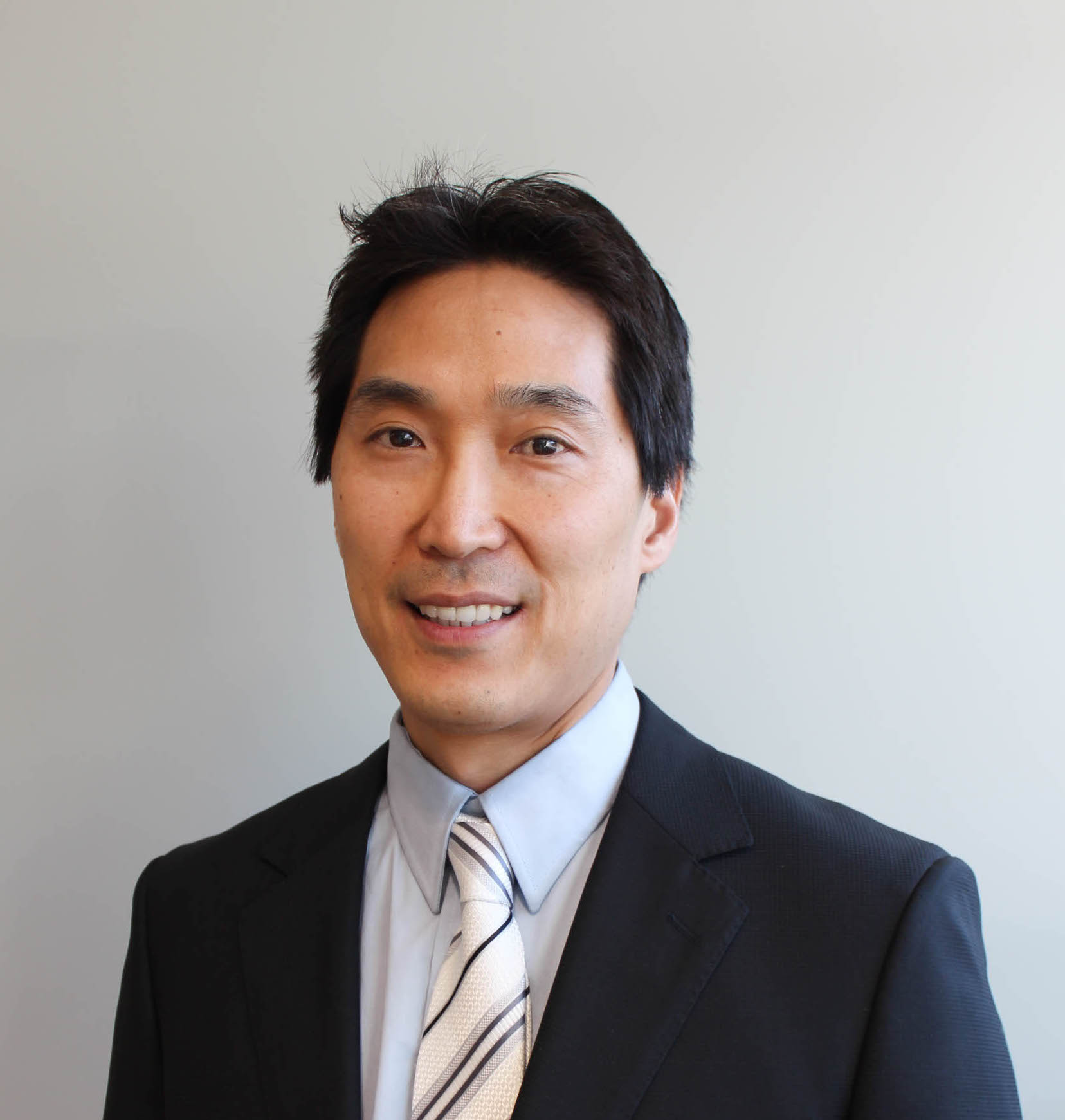
- Born: 1971 (age 54–55)
- Occupations: Nuclear physicist, researcher and educator

Academic background
- Education: Harvard University
- Doctoral advisor: Howard Georgi

Dean Lee (born 1971) is an American nuclear theorist, researcher and educator. He is a professor of physics at the Facility for Rare Isotope Beams (FRIB) and the Department of Physics and Astronomy at Michigan State University and department head of Theoretical Nuclear Science at FRIB.

Lee's research interests include superfluidity, nuclear clustering, nuclear structure from first principles calculations, ab initio scattering and inelastic reactions, and properties of nuclei as seen through electroweak probes. He also works on new technologies and computational paradigms such as eigenvector continuation, machine learning tools to find correlations, and quantum computing algorithms for the nuclear many-body problem.

Lee is a fellow of the American Physical Society.

== Education ==
Lee received an A.B. in Physics in 1992 and a Ph.D. in Theoretical Particle Physics in 1998, both from Harvard University. His Ph.D. advisor was Howard Georgi. From 1998–2001, he joined the nuclear, particle, and gravitational theory group at the University of Massachusetts Amherst for his postdoctoral research under the supervision of John Donoghue, Eugene Golowich, and Barry Holstein.

== Career ==
Lee joined the North Carolina State University as an assistant professor in 2001, becoming associate professor in 2007, and full professor in 2012. In 2017, he moved to the Facility for Rare Isotope Beams (FRIB) at Michigan State University as a professor, jointly appointed in the MSU Department of Physics and Astronomy.

In 2018, Lee served as the chair of the Topical Group on Few-Body Systems and Multiparticle Dynamics of the American Physical Society (APS). He was elected to the Chair Line of the Division of Nuclear Physics in 2022. Since 2018 he has been involved in the establishment of the Advanced Studies Gateway at FRIB, an initiative that brings together researchers, innovators, creative thinkers, artists, and performers from all fields.

In 1991, Lee shared the LeRoy Apker Award of the APS with Stephen Quake. In 2014, he was inducted as a fellow of the APS "for the development of lattice effective field theory as a novel approach to the nuclear few- and many-body problem, and for applications of this technique to the structure of the Hoyle state".

== Research and work ==
Lee's research group develops and applies methods such as lattice effective field theory to study superfluidity, nuclear clustering, nuclear structure from first principles, and quantum scattering and reactions. Some of the techniques include spherical wall methods for scattering on a lattice, impurity lattice Monte Carlo for quantum impurities, adiabatic projection method for nuclear scattering and reactions, pinhole algorithm for nuclear structure, pinhole trace algorithm for thermodynamics, and eigenvector continuation method for quantum correlations beyond perturbation theory.

Lee worked with collaborators Evgeny Epelbaum, Hermann Krebs, and Ulf-G. Meißner, to perform the first ab initio calculations of the Hoyle state of carbon-12. He also worked with collaborators Serdar Elhatisari, Gautam Rupak, Epelbaum, Krebs, Timo Lähde, Thomas Luu, and Meißner, on the first ab initio calculation of alpha-alpha scattering.

His research group also works on new technologies and computational paradigms such as eigenvector continuation, machine learning tools to find correlations, and quantum computing algorithms for the nuclear many-body problem.

=== Lattice effective field theory ===
Lee and collaborators developed lattice effective field theory. Effective field theory (EFT) is an organizing principle for the interactions of a complex system at low energies. When applied to low-energy protons and neutrons in a formulation called chiral EFT, it functions as an expansion in powers of the nucleon momenta and the pion mass. Lattice EFT combines this theoretical framework with lattice methods and Monte Carlo algorithms that are applicable to few-body systems, heavier nuclei, and infinite matter. The Lee research group is part of the Nuclear Lattice EFT Collaboration, which has pioneered many of the theoretical ideas and methods now being used in lattice EFT calculations.

== Awards and honors ==
- 2025 - Fellow, American Association for the Advancement of Science
- 2014 - Fellow, American Physical Society
- 2012 - 2013 - Alumni Distinguished Undergraduate Professor Award
- 2006 - 2007 - Outstanding Teaching Award, NC State University
- 1996 - Robbins Prize, Harvard University
- 1991 - Apker Award, National Co-Winner, American Physical Society

== Selected publications ==
- D. Lee, B. Borasoy, T. Schaefer, "Nuclear Lattice Simulations with Chiral Effective Field Theory", Physical Review C 70, 014007 (2004).
- B. Borasoy, E. Epelbaum, H. Krebs, D. Lee, & U.-G. Meißner, "Lattice simulations for light nuclei: Chiral effective field theory at leading order", European Physical Journal A 31, 1, 105–123 (2007).
- E. Epelbaum, H. Krebs, D. Lee, & U.-G. Meißner, "Ab initio calculation of the Hoyle state", Physical Review Letters 106, 192501 (2011).
- E. Epelbaum, H. Krebs, T. A. Lähde, D. Lee, & U.-G. Meißner, "Structure and Rotations of the Hoyle State", Physical Review Letters 109, 252501 (2012).
- E. Epelbaum, H. Krebs, T. A. Lähde, D. Lee, & U.-G. Meißner, "Viability of Carbon-Based Life as a Function of the Light Quark Mass", Physical Review Letters 110, 112502 (2013).
- S. Elhatisari, D. Lee, G. Rupak, E. Epelbaum, H. Krebs, H., T. A. Lähde, T. Luu, & U.-G. Meißner, "Ab initio alpha–alpha scattering", Nature 528, 111–114 (2015).
- S. Elhatisari, N. Li, A. Rokash, J. M. Alarcón, D. Du, N. Klein, B.-N. Lu, U.-G. Meißner, E. Epelbaum, H. Krebs, T. A. Lähde, D. Lee, G. Rupak, "Nuclear binding near a quantum phase transition", Physical Review Letters 117, 132501 (2016).
- D. Frame, R. He, I. Ipsen, Da. Lee, De. Lee, E. Rrapaj, "Eigenvector continuation with subspace learning", Physical Review Letters 121, 032501 (2018).
- S. Elhatisari, L. Bovermann, Y.-Z. Ma, E. Epelbaum, D. Frame, F. Hildenbrand, M. Kim, Y. Kim, H. Krebs, T.A. Lähde, D. Lee, N. Li, B.-N. Lu, U.-G. Meißner, G. Rupak, S. Shen, Y.-H. Song, & G. Stellin, "Wavefunction matching for solving quantum many-body problems", Nature 630, 59-63 (2024).
