= Annual Review of Condensed Matter Physics =

- Discipline: Condensed matter physics
- Language: English
- Edited by: Leo Radzihovsky

Publication details
- History: 2010–present, 16 years old
- Publisher: Annual Reviews (US)
- Frequency: Annually
- Open access: Subscribe to Open
- Impact factor: 29.0 (2025)

Standard abbreviations
- ISO 4: Annu. Rev. Condens. Matter Phys.

Indexing
- ISSN: 1947-5454 (print); 1947-5462 (web)
- LCCN: 2009202330
- OCLC no.: 313141707

Links
- Journal homepage

The Annual Review of Condensed Matter Physics is an annual peer-reviewed review journal published by Annual Reviews (AR). It was established in 2010 and covers advances in condensed matter physics and related subjects. The editor is Leo Radzihovsky. As of 2023, Annual Review of Condensed Matter Physics is being published as open access, under the Subscribe to Open model. As of 2026, Journal Citation Reports lists the journal's impact factor as 29.0, ranking it third of 81 journal titles in the category "Physics, Condensed Matter" for 2025.

== History ==
The Annual Review of Condensed Matter Physics was first published in 2010 by Annual Reviews (AR), a nonprofit organization whose stated mission is to synthesize knowledge "for the progress of science and the benefit of society." The journal's founding editor was James S. Langer. He was joined by James P. Eisenstein in 2014. M. Cristina Marchetti and Subir Sachdev were co-editors in 2016 and 2017; in 2018, Andrew P. Mackenzie joined as the third co-editor. As of 2021, the co-editors were Marchetti and Mackenzie. Though it was initially published in print, as of 2021 it is only published electronically. As of 2025 the editor is Leo Radzihovsky.

== Scope and indexing ==
The Annual Review of Condensed Matter Physics defines its scope as covering significant developments relevant to condensed matter physics. It is abstracted and indexed in Scopus, Science Citation Index Expanded, Compendex, and INSPEC.

== Editorial processes ==
The Annual Review of Condensed Matter Physics is helmed by the editor or the co-editors. The editor is assisted by the editorial committee, which includes associate editors, regular members, and occasionally guest editors. Guest members participate at the invitation of the editor, and serve terms of one year. All other members of the editorial committee are appointed by the AR board of directors and serve five-year terms. The editorial committee determines which topics should be included in each volume and solicits reviews from qualified authors. Unsolicited manuscripts are not accepted. Peer review of accepted manuscripts is undertaken by the editorial committee.

=== Current editorial board ===
As of 2025, the editorial committee consists of the editor and the following members:

- Daniel F. Agterberg
- Karen E. Daniels
- Emily S. C. Ching
- Sujit S. Datta
- Eduardo H. Fradkin
- Chris Hooley
- Yong Baek Kim
- Masahito Ueda
- Vincenzo Vitelli

== See also ==
- List of physics journals
