= Lou Bloomfield =

American physics professor

- Born: October 11, 1956 (age 70); Boston, Massachusetts
- Awards: LeRoy Apker Award, 1979: Sloan Research Fellowship

Academic background
- Education: Amherst College; Stanford University
- Thesis: High resolution ultraviolet laser spectroscopy of mercury and helium (1983)

Academic work
- Discipline: Physicist
- Sub-discipline: Atomic, molecular, and optical physics
- Institutions: University of Virginia
- Main interests: Clusters, Borosilicones

Louis Aub Bloomfield (born October 11, 1956) is a physics professor at the University of Virginia. Bloomfield became a fellow of the American Physical Society in 1994 for his work on cluster magnetism and has received several other significant honors. Bloomfield is often referenced as a physics authority in major news publications.

== Early life ==
Bloomfield was born in Boston, Massachusetts on October 11, 1956. He lived in Cleveland, Ohio and Urbana, Illinois, graduating from Urbana High School in 1974. Bloomfield attended Amherst College, winning the LeRoy Apker Award in his senior year. He was most interested in medicine after graduating from Amherst, but his physics professors pressured him to apply to three prestigious physics programs in addition to taking the MCAT and applying to medical school at Johns Hopkins University. Bloomfield was accepted into all three physics programs and medical school, but decided to go into physics after asking himself whether he really wanted to be "cutting apart dead bodies in Baltimore." Bloomfield attended Stanford University for physics, receiving his Ph.D. from the school in 1983. He began teaching at the University of Virginia two years later after a postdoc at Bell Laboratories.

== Career ==
Bloomfield began teaching physics at the University of Virginia in 1985. He developed and began teaching a course entitled "How Things Work" in 1991, which he has since taught to thousands of students. This course's success, along with the publishing of a textbook on the subject under the same title, has led to Bloomfield doing a number of interviews and explanations as a guest for large news companies. Bloomfield's explanations of everyday activities and questions have been featured in USA Today, The Huffington Post, and The Washington Post, where he did a series of explanations on sports during the 2016 Summer Olympics. Bloomfield worked with UVA to create an instructional video on social distancing during the COVID-19 pandemic.

=== Inventions ===
Bloomfield has expertise in the field of borosilicate materials and has developed multiple products using this technology. Borosilicates are viscoelastic (a portmanteau of "viscous" and "elastic"), a property that is useful in multiple areas. These inventions include Vistik, a material designed for use in stabilizing wobbly tables, and EarJellies, which are earplugs made from a similar material.

== See also ==
- List of American Physical Society Fellows
