= LeRoy Apker Award =

Award for undergraduate physicists

- Awarded for: outstanding achievements in physics by undergraduate students
- Country: United States
- Presented by: American Physical Society
- First award: 1978
- Website: www.aps.org/programs/honors/prizes/apker.cfm

The LeRoy Apker Award is a prize that has been awarded annually by the American Physical Society (APS) since 1978, named after the experimental physicist LeRoy Apker. The recipients are undergraduate students chosen for "outstanding achievements in physics" in order to "provide encouragement to young physicists who have demonstrated great potential for future scientific accomplishment." The Apker award is the highest honor awarded to undergraduate physicists in the United States. Generally, two prizes are awarded each year: one to a student from a Ph.D. granting institution and one to a student from a non-Ph.D. granting institution. Prior to 1995 the award was granted without institutional distinction, and a single honoree annually was common. The award consists of a $5,000 prize, allowance for traveling to the APS March Meeting to present the work, and a certificate.

== Recipients ==
Year	Recipient	Institution at time of award	Awarded for	Ref.
1978	David E. Heckerman			
1979	Louis A. Bloomfield			
1980	Richard P. Binzel			
1981	Mark B. Ritter			
1982	Subir Sachdev			
1983	Raymond E. Goldstein			
1984	Tak Leuk Kwok			
1985	Julia W.P. Hsu			
1986	Terrence L. Hwa			
1987	Gerard C.L. Wong			
1987	C. James Yeh			
1988	Leo R. Radzihovsky	Rensselaer Polytechnic Institute	For his achievements as an undergraduate student at Rensselaer Polytechnic Institute particularly his undergraduate physics research on electron transport in semiconductors (the so-called polaron problem)	
1989	Deborah L. Kuchnir			
1989	Steven H. Simon			
1990	Charles J. Brabec			
1991	Dean Lee			
1991	Stephen Quake			
1992	Christopher Barnes			
1992	Justin L. Mortara	University of Chicago	"For his achievements as an undergraduate student at The University of Chicago, particularly his research on 'Search for a 17-keV neutrino in the β-decay of S-35'."	
1993	David Kaiser			
1994	Arthur Chu	Harvard University	"For his achievements as an undergraduate student at Harvard University, particularly his research on 'Laser Manipulation of Three Level System'."	
1994	Brandon C. Collings	Hamilton College	"For his achievements as an undergraduate student at Hamilton College, particularly his research on 'Avalanche Upconversion in LaF3:Tm3+'."	
1994	Steven S. Gubser	Princeton University	"For his achievements as an undergraduate student at Princeton University, particularly his research on 'Geodesic Distance in Two-Dimensional Quantum Gravity'."	
1995	Benjamin F. Williams	Middlebury College	"For his achievements as an undergraduate student at Middlebury College, particularly his research on 'Identification and Study of Supernova Remnants in the Galaxy M31'."	
1995	Frederick B. Mancoff	Stanford University	"For his achievements as an undergraduate student at Stanford University, particularly his research on 'Two-Dimensional Electron Transport and Magnetoresistance Effects in a Random Magnetic Dipole Array'."	
1996	Benjamin S. Williams	Haverford College	"For his achievements as an undergraduage student at Haverford College, particularly his research on 'Mixing of a Passive Scalar in Two-Dimensional Turbulence'."	
1996	Christopher Schaffer	University of Florida	"For his achievements as an undergraduate student at the University of Florida, particularly for his research on 'Programmable Shaping of Ultrabroad-bandwidth Pulses from a Ti:sapphire Laser'."	
1997	Anna Lopatnikova	Massachusetts Institute of Technology	"Renormalization-Group Theory of Superfluidity and Phase Separation of Helium Mixtures Immersed in Aerogel."	
1997	Cameron Geddes	Swarthmore College	"Spheromak Equilibrium Studies on SSX."	
1998	Brian Richard D'Urso			
1998	Gwendolyn Rae Bell	Harvey Mudd College	"For her achievements as an undergraduate student at Harvey Mudd College and particularly her research Mass of the Milky Way and Dwarf Spheroidal Stream Membership."	
1999	Brian Gerke	Williams College	"For his achievements as an undergraduate student at Williams College and particularly his research entitled, Ultrafast Photoisomerization Dynamics: A Tight-binding Model Applied to Small Alkenes."	
1999	Govind Krishnaswami	University of Rochester	"For his achievements as an undergraduate student at the University of Rochester and particularly his research entitled, A Model of Interacting Partons for Hadronic Structure Functions."	
2000	Heather J. Lynch	Princeton University	"A Kondo Box: Coulomb Blockade and the Kondo Effect in Iron-doped Copper Nanoparticles."	
2000	Jacob Jonathan Krich	Swarthmore College	"Correlation Length and Chirality of Isotropic Short-Range Order in Nematic and Chiral Nematic Liquid Crystals."	
2000	Steven J. Oliver	University of California, Berkeley	"Laser Cooling to High Phase Space Densities."	
2001	Kathryn Todd	California Institute of Technology	"Studies of Double-Layer Two-Dimensional Electron Gases."	
2001	Robert Wagner	Illinois State University	"Intense Laser Physics Theory."	
2002	Jason Alicea	University of Florida	"Resistance of multilayers with long length scale interfacial roughness."	
2002	S. Charles Doret	Williams College	"A Precise Measurement of the Stark Shift in the 6⁢𝑃_{1/2}⁢−7⁢𝑆_{1/2} 378 nm Transition in Atomic Thallium."	
2003	Nathaniel Stern	Harvey Mudd College	"Exchange Anisotropy and Giant Magnetoresistance in Thin Film Spin Valves Containing Ultra-thin IrMn Antiferromagnetic Layers."	
2003	Peter Onyisi	University of Chicago	"Looking for New Invisible Particles."	
2004	Jonathan Heckman	Princeton University	"Large R-charged Sectors of the Ads/CFT Correspondence."	
2004	Nathan Oken Hodas	Williams College	"Oligo-RNA Optimal Binding Calculation."	
2005	David W. Miller	University of Chicago	"Search for high energy axions with the CAST calorimeter."	
2005	Matthew Paoletti	Bucknell University	"Experimental Studies of the Effects of Chaotic Mixing on an Advection-Reaction-Diffusion System."	
2005	Nathaniel Craig	Harvard University	"Tunable Nonlocal Spin Control in a Coupled Quantum Dot System."	
2006	Huanqian Loh	Massachusetts Institute of Technology	"Applications of Correlated Photon Pairs: Sub-Shot Noise Interferometry and Entanglement."	
2006	Hugh Churchill	Oberlin College	"Low-temperature infrared spectroscopy of H_{2} in solid C_{60}."	
2006	Stephanie Moyerman	Harvey Mudd College	"Magnetic Structure Variations in Spin Valves with Pico-Scale Antiferromagnetic Layers."	
2007	Bryce Gadway	Colgate University	"Creation and Measurement of a Single-Proton Two-Qubit State to Test a Bell-Kochen-Specker Inequality."	
2007	Matthew Becker	University of Michigan	"The Velocity Structure of MAXBCG Galaxy Clusters from the Sloan Digital Sky Survey."	
2008	Byron C. Drury	Haverford College	"Factoring Quantum Logic Gates with Cartan Involutions."	
2008	Sujit S. Datta	University of Pennsylvania	"Surface Potentials and Layer Charge Distributions in Few-Layer Graphene Films."	
2009	Bilin Zhuang	Wellesley College	"Thermodynamics of Ising Systems of the Triangular Kagome Lattice and Small-Model Approximations to Geometrically Frustrated Systems"	
2009	Kathryn Greenberg	Mount Holyoke College	"Thermal Coupling and Lensing in Arrays of Vertical Cavity Surface Emitting Lasers"	
2010	Chia Wei Hsu	Wesleyan University	"Self-Assembly of DNA-Linked Nanoparticles."	
2010	Christopher Chudzicki	Williams College	"Parallel Entanglement Distribution on Hypercube Networks."	
2011	Bethany Jochim	Augustana College	"Strong-field dissociation dynamics of NO2+: A multiphoton electronic or vibrational excitation."	
2011	Djordje Radicevic	Princeton University	"Holography from Renormalization Group Flows."	
2012	Theodore Yoder	Franklin & Marshall College	"The Standard Model Extension and its Application to Hydrogen."	
2012	Yuliya Dovzhenko	Princeton University	"Coherent Control of a Semiconductor Charge Qubit."	
2013	Guy Geyer Marcus	Wesleyan University	"Rotational Dynamics of Anisotropic Particles in Turbulence: Measurements of Lagrangian Vorticity and the Effects of Alignment with the Velocity Gradient."	
2013	Hao Shi	Rochester Institute of Technology	"Torsional Optomechanics: A Dialogue Between Spinning Photons and Twisting Oscillators."	
2014	Kevin Seltzer	Loyola University Maryland	"Finite Temperature Casimir Effect for Charged Scalars in a Magnetic Field"	
2014	Michael Veit	University of Minnesota	"Transport Measurements of the Cuprate Superconductor HgBa_{2}Cu_{4+δ}"	
2015	Adam Sean Jermyn	California Institute of Technology	"For original contributions to understanding how the atmospheres of pulsar companions are heated and for elucidating the observational consequences."	
2015	Benjamin Lee Augenbraun	Williams College	"For high-precision measurement of the DC Stark shift in the two-step 5P1/2 —> 6S1/2—> 6P1/2 transition in atomic indium."	
2016	Nick Rivera	Massachusetts Institute of Technology	"For important advances in the field of photonics and exceptional leadership of the Society of Physics Students."	
2016	Stephanie Gorczyca	University of San Diego	"For investigation into the effect of crowding on dynamics of DNA using single-molecule tracking techniques."	
2017	Angela F. Harper	Wake Forest University	"for significant contributions to printed electronics research and outstanding leadership of the Society of Physics Students and Society of Women in STEM fields."	
2017	Calvin Leung	Harvey Mudd College	"for development and experimental implementation of astronomical random number generators for loophole-free tests of Bell’s inequality and other applications in quantum fundamentals, astrophysics, and tests of general relativity."	
2018	Eric S. Cooper	Pomona College	"For outstanding contributions towards understanding the adaptive significance of ballistichory by modeling and comparing the flight of seeds dispersed by Acanthaceae fruits."	
2018	Nicholas E. Sherman	University of California, Davis	"For outstanding undergraduate research in theoretical condensed matter and mathematical physics dealing with the subjects of quantum entanglement in mixed states, NMR in highly frustrated magnets and anyon dispersion in perturbed Toric Code models."	
2019	Katelyn Cook	Houghton College	"For experimental contributions toward the measurement of low-energy nuclear cross sections using inertial confinement fusion."	
2019	Tali Khain	University of Michigan	"For original contributions to understanding the outer solar system, including characterizing the dynamical properties of hundreds of new objects in the Kuiper Belt; establishing the orbital stability of a new dwarf planet; and investigating the effects of a hypothesized distant new planet."	
2020	EliseAnne C Koskelo	Pomona College	"For the development and experimental validation of an analytic model that exploits noise in CCD-based thermoreflectance imaging systems to maximize the thermal resolution of the technique via the stochastic resonance effect."	
2020	Nicholas Poniatowski	University of Maryland, College Park	"For original contributions to understanding the outer solar system, including characterizing the dynamical properties of hundreds of new objects in the Kuiper Belt; establishing the orbital stability of a new dwarf planet; and investigating the effects of a hypothesized distant new planet."	
2021	Caelan Brooks	Kutztown University of Pennsylvania	"For the discovery of distinct dynamical regimes for coherent ultracold atoms confined in a ring-shaped lattice potential; and for developing a statistical model that depicts the formation of phenotypic patterns associated with bacterial biofilm growth."	
2021	Joseph R. Farah	University of Massachusetts Boston	"For the invention of the selective dynamical imaging method, with applications for studying rapidly-varying black holes."	
2022	Adam Dionne	Williams College	"For the development of a novel experimental and theoretical framework to establish a new understanding of nutrient dispersal and transport in Physarum polycephalum."	
2022	Matthew Cufari	Syracuse University	"For verifying the Hills Mechanism as a viable method to generate repeating partial tidal disruption events."	
2023	Cailin Plunkett	Amherst College	"For the development of a novel method to compute survey sensitivity to accreting protoplanets."	
2023	Denisse Córdova Carrizales	Harvard University	"For the development of a new method to intercalate Li into thin films of indium tin oxide."	
2024	Eritas Yang	Harvey Mudd College	"For developing a perturbative model for the long-term secular dynamics of coplanar three-planet systems, elucidating the physics of such systems."	
2024	Jin Ming Koh	California Institute of Technology	"For the first experimental realization of a measurement-induced entanglement phase transition on a superconducting quantum processor."	
2025	Justyn M. Friedler	Williams College	"For groundbreaking undergraduate research integrating theory and experiment to reveal the fracture energy of adsorbed proteins, advancing fundamental understanding of surface-tension-driven thin film fracture"	
2025	Samuel Crowe	University of Virginia	"For groundbreaking undergraduate research achievements that uncovered a new stellar nursery, magnetically aligned ionized hydrogen filaments, and key evidence reshaping understanding of magnetic fields and protostellar outflows in massive star formation."	
2026	Isabelle Connor	University of California, Santa Cruz	"For outstanding contributions to astrophysics through numerical simulations of stellar feedback, including the discovery of a universal turbulent cascade connecting galactic disks to large-scale winds and the establishment of foundational temporal scalings for supernova-driven turbulence."	
2026	Sylvie V. Shaya	Wellesley College	"For outstanding contributions to soft matter physics through creative characterization of dense deformable particle systems, including the development of novel network theory methods to resolve complex collective motion and the discovery of fundamental dynamics in highly compressed materials."	

== See also ==
- List of physics awards
- List of prizes named after people
- Morgan Prize, an award for outstanding undergraduate mathematicians
