= Emily S. C. Ching =

Hong Kong theoretical physicist

- Education: University of Hong Kong; Chinese University of Hong Kong; University of Chicago
- Scientific career
- Workplaces: Chinese University of Hong Kong

Emily Shuk Chi Ching (Chinese: 程淑姿) is a Hong Kong theoretical physicist based at the Chinese University of Hong Kong. She researches fluid turbulence and has been elected as a fellow of the Institute of Physics and American Physical Society.

== Education ==
Emily Shuk Chi Ching attended the University of Hong Kong for her bachelor's degree and the Chinese University of Hong Kong for her master's degree. She graduated from the University of Chicago with a PhD in physics in 1992. She then completed a post-doctoral research appointment at the Kavli Institute for Theoretical Physics, which is part of the University of California, Santa Barbara.

== Career ==
After finishing her post-doc, Ching returned to Hong Kong, accepting a position at the Chinese University of Hong Kong in 1995. Her research interests include scaling and structures as they relate to fluid turbulence, polymers in turbulence, boundary layers in Rayleigh–Bénard convection, and network reconstruction from dynamics.

She has been involved as an associate editor or editorial board member for several journals, including Physical Review E, Annual Review of Condensed Matter Physics, and Journal of Turbulence.

== Awards and honours ==
In 1999 she received the Achievement in Asia Award from the Overseas Chinese Physics Association. Ching was elected as a fellow of the Institute of Physics in 2004 and the American Physical Society in 2005.

== Personal life ==
She speaks Cantonese and English.
