= Leo Radzihovsky =

Russian-American condensed matter physicist (born 1966)

- Born: June 2, 1966 (age 60); Saint Petersburg, Russia
- Awards: Fellow American Physical Society (2003); Simons Investigator, Simons Foundation (2014)

Academic background
- Education: B.S. Physics, Rensselaer Polytechnic Institute; M.S. Physics, Rensselaer Polytechnic Institute; A.M. Physics, Harvard University; Ph.D. Physics, Harvard University
- Alma mater: Rensselaer Polytechnic Institute; Harvard University
- Thesis: Statistical mechanics and geometry of random manifolds (1993)

Leo Radzihovsky is a Russian American condensed matter physicist and academic, currently serving as a professor of distinction in Physics at the University of Colorado Boulder. Radzihovsky's theoretical research integrates classical and quantum aspects of condensed matter, revealing novel states of matter and phase transitions between them driven by strong fluctuations and/or spatial heterogeneity.

He is the recipient of the LeRoy Apker Award. Radzihovsky is a Simons Foundation Investigator, a Fellow of the David and Lucile Packard Foundation, a Fellow of the American Physical Society, and an Alfred P. Sloan Research Fellow.

== Early life and education ==
Born in Saint Petersburg, Russia, Radzihovsky immigrated to the US in 1980. In 1988, he earned his B.S. and M.S. in Physics with a minor in Electrical Engineering from Rensselaer Polytechnic Institute (RPI). He completed his Ph.D. at Harvard in 1993, supported by the Hertz Graduate Fellowship, and pursued a Postdoctoral Fellowship at the James Franck Institute at the University of Chicago.

== Career ==
Radzihovsky started his academic career as an assistant professor of physics at CU Boulder in 1995, was promoted to associate professor in 2001, and then to Professor in 2003, and was named a Professor of Distinction in 2023.

Radzihovsky served as a member of the advisory board at the Kavli Institute for Theoretical Physics from 2013–2017 and as its chair from 2015–2016. He has served as a Member at Large of the Executive Committee at APS from 2019 to 2022. He has also served as a member of the editorial board for the Annals of Physics (2001–2012) and on the board for the Annual Review of Condensed Matter Physics since 2015. As of 2025, he is the editor of the Annual Review of Condensed Matter Physics.

== Research ==
Radzihovsky's theoretical research is focused on the interplay and synergy between classical "soft" and quantum "hard" condensed matter, and macroscopic systems that consist of fluids and solids of strongly interacting constituents, be they electrons, atoms, molecules, or bacteria.

Radzihovsky explored vortex glassy matter of type-II superconductors in magnetic field, charge density waves (CDW), Wigner, and colloidal crystals pinned by a substrate and/or an ever-present random quenched disorder, and broadly researched non-equilibrium dynamics and phase transitions of such driven elastic media.

Radzihovsky has contributed to liquid crystal phases and their phase transitions. These include novel banana bent-core shaped mesogens, anti- and ferroelectric nematic and smectic phases, and spontaneously chiral and cholesteric liquid crystals.

In quantum hard matter, Radzihovsky's contributions include predictions regarding degenerate atomic gases (AMO systems) controlled by narrow Feshbach resonances, which he used to study BCS-BEC crossover in paired balanced fermionic superfluids. He further demonstrated finite-angular momentum Feshbach resonances as a mechanism toward a realization of topological paired superfluidity and concomitant Majorana vortex modes, of interest for topological quantum computing. Applying these Feshbach resonances to degenerate bosonic atom counterparts, he with his Ph.D. students predicted novel molecular and finite-momentum superfluid phases, with the former recently observed experimentally.

== Awards and honors ==
- 1998 – Fellow, David and Lucile Packard Foundation
- 2003 – Fellow, American Physical Society
- 2014 – Simons Investigator in Physics, Simons Foundation
- 2023 – Professor of Distinction, University of Colorado

== Selected articles ==
- Le Doussal, P., & Radzihovsky, L. (1992). Self-consistent theory of polymerized membranes. Physical review letters, 69(8), 1209.
- Radzihovsky, L., & Toner, J. (1997). Nematic–to–Smectic-A Transition in Aerogel. Physical review letters, 79(21), 4214.
- Bellini, T., Radzihovsky, L., Toner, J., & Clark, N. A. (2001). Universality and scaling in the disordering of a smectic liquid crystal. Science, 294(5544), 1074-1079.
- Gurarie, V., Radzihovsky, L., & Andreev, A. V. (2005). Quantum phase transitions across a p-wave Feshbach resonance. Physical review letters, 94(23), 230403.
- Sheehy, D. E., & Radzihovsky, L. (2006). BEC-BCS crossover in “magnetized” Feshbach-resonantly paired superfluids. Physical review letters, 96(6), 060401.
- Gurarie, V., & Radzihovsky, L. (2007). Resonantly paired fermionic superfluids. Annals of Physics, 322(1), 2-119.
- Pretko, M., & Radzihovsky, L. (2018). Fracton-Elasticity Duality. Physical Review Letters. 120 (19): 195301.
- Agterberg, D. F., Davis, J. S., Edkins, S. D., Fradkin, E., Van Harlingen, D. J., Kivelson, S. A.,... Radzihovsky, L. & Wang, Y. (2020). The physics of pair-density waves: Cuprate superconductors and beyond. Annual Review of Condensed Matter Physics, 11, 231-270.
