= Subir Sachdev =

Indian physicist

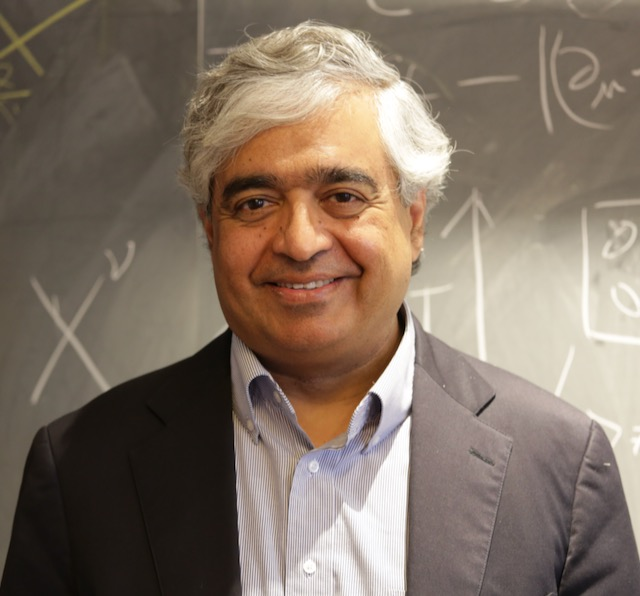
- Born: 2 December 1961 (age 64); New Delhi, India
- Education: Massachusetts Institute of Technology (B.S); Harvard University (Ph.D)
- Known for: Sachdev–Ye–Kitaev model
- Awards: LeRoy Apker Award (1982); Sloan Fellowship (1989); Guggenheim Fellowship (2003); National Academy of Sciences (2014); UNSW Dirac Medal (2015); Lars Onsager Prize (2018); ICTP Dirac Medal (2018); Royal Society (2023)
- Scientific career
- Fields: Condensed matter theory
- Thesis: Frustration and Order in Rapidly Cooled Metals (1985)
- Doctoral advisor: D. R. Nelson
- Website: sachdev.physics.harvard.edu

Subir Sachdev is Herchel Smith professor of physics at Harvard University specializing in condensed matter. He was elected to the U.S. National Academy of Sciences in 2014, received the Lars Onsager Prize from the American Physical Society and the Dirac Medal from the ICTP in 2018, and was elected Foreign Member of the Royal Society ForMemRS in 2023. He was a co-editor of the Annual Review of Condensed Matter Physics 2017–2019, and is Editor-in-Chief of Reports on Progress in Physics since 2022.

Sachdev's research describes the consequences of quantum entanglement on the macroscopic properties of natural systems. He has described diverse varieties of entangled states of quantum matter, and of their behavior near quantum phase transitions. Many of these contributions have been linked to experiments, especially to the rich phase diagrams of the high temperature superconductors. Sachdev's research has exposed connections between the nature of quantum entanglement in certain laboratory materials, and the quantum entanglement in astrophysical black holes, and these connections have led to insights on the entropy and radiation of black holes.

== Career ==
Sachdev attended school at St. Joseph's Boys' High School, Bangalore and Kendriya Vidyalaya, ASC, Bangalore. He attended college at Indian Institute of Technology, Delhi for a year. He transferred to Massachusetts Institute of Technology where he received a BS in Physics. He received his PhD in theoretical physics from Harvard University. He held professional positions at Bell Labs (1985–1987) and at Yale University (1987–2005), where he was a Professor of Physics, before returning to Harvard, where he is now the Herchel Smith Professor of Physics. He has also held visiting positions as the Cenovus Energy James Clerk Maxwell Chair in Theoretical Physics at the Perimeter Institute for Theoretical Physics, and the Dr. Homi J. Bhabha Chair Professorship at the Tata Institute of Fundamental Research. He has been a Visiting Scholar at the Flatiron Institute since 2019, and Miguel Virasoro Visiting International Chair, at the International Centre for Theoretical Physics since 2024. He has also been on the Physical Sciences jury for the Infosys Prize from 2018.

== Research ==
Sachdev has studied the nature of quantum entanglement in two-dimensional antiferromagnets, as reviewed in his book Quantum Phases of Matter. This work introduced

- the Z_{2} spin liquid, which preserves time-reversal symmetry and has the same anyon structure as the toric code.
- deconfined quantum critical points which do not have sharp particle-like excitations.
- the fractionalized Fermi liquid (FL), a metallic state whose Fermi surface does not enclose the Luttinger volume.

Sachdev has developed the theory of quantum criticality (originally introduced by John A. Hertz), elucidating its implications for experimental observations on materials at non-zero temperature. He described the phenomenon of "Planckian dissipation" in a time scale of order ℏ/kT (where ℏ is Planck constant, k is the Boltzmann constant and T is the absolute temperature), and independent of microscopic energy scales. This theory led to the proposal of hydrodynamic electron flow in graphene and related two-dimensional materials. He proposed a solvable model of complex quantum entanglement in a metal which does not have any particle-like excitations in 1993: an extension of this is now called the Sachdev-Ye-Kitaev model (SYK). These works have led to a theory of quantum phase transitions in metals in the presence of impurity-induced disorder, and a universal theory of strange metals.

Sachdev's theories apply to a variety of correlated electron materials, including the copper-oxide materials exhibiting high temperature superconductivity. Features of the "pseudogap" phase of these materials are addressed by his works on the interplay between antiferromagnetism and superconductivity, using the theory of critical quantum spin liquids without quasiparticles.

A connection between the structure of quantum entanglement in the SYK model and in black holes was first proposed by Sachdev in 2010, and these connections have led to developments in the quantum theory of black holes.

== Awards and honors ==
- LeRoy Apker Award Recipient, 1982.
- Alfred P. Sloan Foundation Fellow, February 1989.
- Fellow of the American Physical Society "for his contributions to the theory of quantum phase transitions and its application to correlated electron materials".
- John Simon Guggenheim Memorial Foundation Fellow, 2003.
- Perimeter Institute for Theoretical Physics Distinguished Research Chair, 2009–14.
- Abdus Salam Distinguished Lecturer, International Center for Theoretical Physics, Trieste, Italy, 2014.
- Hendrik Lorentz Chair, Lorentz Institute, 2012.
- Elected to the U.S. National Academy of Sciences, 2014. Citation: Sachdev has made seminal advances in the theory of condensed matter systems near a quantum phase transition, which have elucidated the rich variety of static and dynamic behavior in such systems, both at finite temperatures and at T=0. His book, Quantum Phase Transitions, is the basic text of the field.
- Dirac Medal for the Advancement of Theoretical Physics (University of New South Wales), 2015. Citation: The Dirac Medal was awarded to Professor Sachdev in recognition of his many seminal contributions to the theory of strongly interacting condensed matter systems: quantum phase transitions, including the idea of critical deconfinement and the breakdown of the conventional symmetry based Landau–Ginsburg–Wilson paradigm; the prediction of exotic 'spin-liquid' and fractionalized states; and applications to the theory of high-temperature superconductivity in the cuprate materials.
- Lars Onsager Prize (American Physical Society), 2018, to recognize outstanding research in theoretical statistical physics including the quantum fluids. Citation: for his seminal contributions to the theory of quantum phase transitions, quantum magnetism, and fractionalized spin liquids, and for his leadership in the physics community.
- Dirac Medal (International Center for Theoretical Physics), 2018; shared with Dam Thanh Son and Xiao-Gang Wen for "independent contributions towards understanding novel phases in strongly interacting many-body systems, introducing original transdisciplinary techniques". Citation: Subir Sachdev has made pioneering contributions to many areas of theoretical condensed matter physics. Of particular importance were the development of the theory of quantum critical phenomena in insulators, superconductors and metals; the theory of spin-liquid states of quantum antiferromagnets and the theory of fractionalized phases of matter; the study of novel deconfinement phase transitions; the theory of quantum matter without quasiparticles; and the application of many of these ideas to a priori unrelated problems in black hole physics, including a concrete model of non-Fermi liquids.
- Foreign Fellow of the Indian National Science Academy, 2019. Citation: Professor Subir Sachdev is a world renowned condensed matter theorist, with many seminal contributions to the theory of strongly interacting condensed matter systems. He is a pioneer in the study of systems near quantum phase transitions. He has also pioneered the exploration of the connection between physical properties of modern quantum materials and the nature of quantum entanglement in their many-particle state, elucidating the diverse varieties of entangled states of quantum matter.
- Elected to the American Academy of Arts and Sciences, 2019.
- Honorary Fellow of the Indian Academy of Sciences, 2019.
- Jacques Solvay International Chair in Physics, International Solvay Institutes, Brussels, 2023
- Raman Chair, Indian Academy of Sciences, 2023–24.
- Foreign Member of the Royal Society, 2023. Citation: Subir Sachdev has made profound contributions to theoretical condensed matter physics research. His main interests have been in quantum magnetism, quantum criticality, and perhaps most innovative of all, links between the nature of quantum entanglement in black holes and strongly interacting electrons in materials.

== Publications ==
- 5 selected papers with commentaries
- 20 selected papers with commentaries
- List of all publications
- List of Publications on the arXiv
- List of Publications not on the arXiv
- Subir Sachdev publications indexed by Google Scholar
- YouTube channel of Subir Sachdev with video lectures
- Video lectures on Perimeter Institute Archive
- Talks at KITP Santa Barbara

== Books ==
- Sachdev, Subir (7 April 2011). Quantum Phase Transitions. Cambridge University Press. ISBN 978-1-139-50021-0.
- Hartnoll, Sean A.; Lucas, Andrew; Sachdev, Subir (16 March 2018). Holographic Quantum Matter. MIT Press. ISBN 978-0-262-34802-7.
- Sachdev, Subir (13 April 2023). Quantum Phases of Matter. Cambridge University Press. ISBN 978-1-009-21269-4.
