= Schön scandal =

Scientific misconduct scandal

The Schön scandal was a case of academic misconduct and scientific fraud perpetuated by German physicist Jan Hendrik Schön (born August 1970). He briefly rose to prominence after a series of apparently successful experiments with semiconductors that showed revolutionary results, but were discovered later to be fraudulent. Before he was exposed, Schön had received the Otto-Klung-Weberbank Prize for Physics and the Braunschweig Prize in 2001, as well as the Outstanding Young Investigator Award of the Materials Research Society in 2002, all of which were later rescinded. He was also supposed to receive the William L. McMillan Award from the University of Illinois in 2002, but due to the intervention of Daniel C. Ralph of Cornell University (who was on the committee of the McMillan Award), Schön was never given the award.

The scandal provoked discussion in the scientific community about the degree of responsibility which coauthors and reviewers of scientific articles bear in cases of scientific misbehavior. The discussion mainly concerned whether peer review, traditionally designed to find errors and determine relevance and originality of articles, should also be required to detect deliberate fraud.

== Beginning of fame ==
Schön's topic of research was condensed matter physics and nanotechnology. He received his PhD from the University of Konstanz in 1997. During late 1997, he was hired by Bell Labs, where he worked on electronics in which conventional semiconducting elements (such as silicon) were replaced by crystalline organic (meaning carbon-based) materials. Schön, however, claimed spectacular ability for changing the conductivity of the organic materials, well beyond anything achieved to date. His measurements in most cases confirmed various theoretical predictions, notably that the organic materials could be made to display superconductivity or be used in lasers. The findings were published in prominent scientific publications, including the journals Science and Nature, and gained worldwide attention. However, no research group anywhere in the world succeeded in reproducing the results claimed by Schön.

In 2001, he was listed as an author on an average of one newly published research paper every eight days. In the same year, he announced in Nature that he had produced a transistor on the molecular scale. Schön claimed to have used a thin layer of organic dye molecules to assemble an electric circuit that, when acted on by an electric current, behaved as a transistor. The implications of his work were significant. It would have been the beginning of a transition from using silicon-based electronics and toward using organic electronics. It would have allowed the continued miniaturization of transistors past the point at which silicon breaks down, which would continue Moore's law for much longer than was then predicted. It also would have drastically reduced the cost of electronics.

A major element of Schön's work claimed that successful observation of various physical phenomena in organic materials was dependent on the transistor setup. Specifically, Schön claimed to use a thin layer of aluminium oxide which he incorporated into his transistors using laboratory facilities at the University of Konstanz. However, while the equipment and materials used were common in laboratories all over the world, none succeeded in preparing aluminium oxide layers of similar quality to the ones claimed by Schön.

== Allegations and investigation ==
Soon after Schön published his work on single-molecule semiconductors, others in the physics community alleged that his data contained anomalies. Julia Hsu and Lynn Loo originally noticed problems with Schön's paper describing the assembly of molecular transistors while attempting to patent research concerning lithography, realizing that Schön had duplicated some numbers. Hsu and Loo had attempted initial experiments to gather evidence for their patent but relied on the scientific outcomes of Schön's work. It was not until April 19, 2002, when Loo and Hsu were meeting with their patent lawyer John McCabe, that they noticed the duplicated data. Hsu and Loo both contacted Robert Willett, who then contacted one of his old postdoctoral students, Lydia Sohn, telling her to look out for a correction in one of Schön's papers. Sohn, then of Princeton University, noticed that two experiments carried out at very different temperatures had identical noise. When the editors of Nature mentioned this to Schön, he claimed to have accidentally submitted the same graph twice. Paul McEuen of Cornell University then found the same noise in a paper describing a third experiment. More research by McEuen, Sohn, Loo, and other physicists revealed a number of examples of duplicate data in Schön's work. McEuen gathered the six most convincing pieces of evidence regarding Schön's fabrication of data he could find, and sent it to Schön, John A. Rogers, Bertram Batlogg, and editors from the journals Science and Nature. In response, Lucent Technologies (which managed Bell Labs) soon began a formal investigation.

During May 2002, Bell Labs established a five-person committee to investigate, with Malcolm R. Beasley from Stanford University as chair. The remaining four members were Supriyo Datta of Purdue University, Herwig Kogelnik of Bell Labs, Herbert Kroemer of the University of California, Santa Barbara, and Don Monroe of Agere Systems.The committee obtained information from all of Schön's coauthors and interviewed the three principal ones (Zhenan Bao, Bertram Batlogg and Christian Kloc). The committee found that none of the three authors ever saw Schön take measurements from his devices in real time. It examined electronic drafts of the disputed articles, which included processed numeric data. The committee requested copies of the raw data, but found that Schön had kept no laboratory notebooks. His raw data files had been erased from his computer. According to Schön, the files were erased because his computer had limited hard drive space. Additionally, all of his experimental samples, working, and non-working devices had either been discarded or damaged beyond repair, so the committee was unable to conduct examinations of those; a prior example of poor record-keeping at Bell Labs had been noticed in 1988 by a doctoral student when studying the evolution of the Unix operating system.

On September 25, 2002, the committee released its report publicly. The report contained details of 24 allegations of misconduct on Schön's part. They found evidence of scientific misconduct in at least 16 of them, while the remaining 8 were either unrelated to publications or were "troubling", but lacked compelling evidence of misconduct. They found that whole data sets had been reused for a number of different experiments. They also found that some of his graphs, which had purportedly been plotted from experimental data, had instead been produced using mathematical functions.

The report found that all of the misdeeds had been performed by Schön alone. All of the coauthors (including Bertram Batlogg, who was the head of the team) were exonerated of scientific misconduct. However, the report was critical of whether or not the coauthors were sufficiently critical in questioning and validating the results of Schön's papers. This caused widespread debate in the scientific community on how the blame for misconduct should be distributed among co-authors, particularly when they share a significant part of the credit.

== Aftermath and sanctions ==
Schön acknowledged that the data were incorrect in many of these articles. He claimed that the substitutions could have occurred by honest mistake. He omitted some data and stated that he did so to show more convincing evidence for behavior that he observed. However, he also claimed that he had observed genuine physical effects.

Researchers at Delft University of Technology and the Thomas J. Watson Research Center had since performed experiments similar to Schön's, without achieving similar results. Even before the allegations had become public, several research groups had tried to reproduce most of his spectacular results with respect to the topic of the physics of organic molecular materials, without success.

In June 2004, the University of Konstanz issued a press release stating that Schön's doctoral degree had been revoked due to "dishonourable conduct". Department of Physics spokesman Wolfgang Dieterich termed the affair the "biggest fraud in physics in the last 50 years" and said that the "credibility of science had been brought into disrepute". Schön appealed the ruling, but on October 28, 2009, it was upheld by the university. In response, Schön sued the University of Konstanz and appeared in court to testify on September 23, 2010. The court overturned the decision on September 27, 2010. However, in November 2010 the university acted to appeal the court's ruling. The state court ruled in September 2011 that the university was correct in revoking his doctorate. The Federal Administrative Court sustained the state court's decision in July 2013, and the Federal Constitutional Court confirmed it in September 2014. The FCC declined to hear Schön's further complaint.

In October 2014, the Deutsche Forschungsgemeinschaft (DFG, the German Research Foundation) Joint Committee announced sanctions against him. Schön was deprived of his right to vote in DFG elections or serve on DFG committees for an eight-year period. During that period, Schön was also unable to serve as a peer reviewer or apply for DFG funds.

Following the scandal, Schön returned to Germany and accepted a job with a company as a process engineer.

== Withdrawn journal articles ==
On October 31, 2002, Science withdrew eight articles written by Schön:

- J. H. Schön; S. Berg; Ch. Kloc; B. Batlogg (2000). "Ambipolar Pentacene Field-Effect Transistors and Inverters". Science. 287 (5455): 1022–3. Bibcode:2000Sci...287.1022S. doi:10.1126/science.287.5455.1022. PMID 10669410. (Retracted, see doi:10.1126/science.298.5595.961b, PMID 12416506)
- J. H. Schön; Ch. Kloc; R. C. Haddon; B. Batlogg (2000). "A Superconducting Field-Effect Switch". Science. 288 (5466): 656–8. doi:10.1126/science.288.5466.656. PMID 10784445. S2CID 37783357. (Retracted, see doi:10.1126/science.298.5595.961b, PMID 12416506)
- J. H. Schön; Ch. Kloc; B. Batlogg (2000). "Fractional Quantum Hall Effect in Organic Molecular Semiconductors". Science. 288 (5475): 2338–40. doi:10.1126/science.288.5475.2338. PMID 17769842. (Retracted, see doi:10.1126/science.298.5595.961b, PMID 12416506)
- J. H. Schön; Ch. Kloc; A. Dodabalapur; B. Batlogg (2000). "An Organic Solid State Injection Laser". Science. 289 (5479): 599–601. Bibcode:2000Sci...289..599S. doi:10.1126/science.289.5479.599. PMID 10915617. (Retracted, see doi:10.1126/science.298.5595.961b, PMID 12416506)
- J. H. Schön; Ch. Kloc; B. Batlogg (2000). "A Light-Emitting Field-Effect Transistor". Science. 290 (5493): 963–6. Bibcode:2000Sci...290..963S. doi:10.1126/science.290.5493.963. PMID 11062124. (Retracted, see doi:10.1126/science.298.5595.961b, PMID 12416506)
- J. H. Schön; Ch. Kloc; H. Y. Hwang; B. Batlogg (2001). "Josephson Junctions with Tunable Weak Links". Science. 292 (5515): 252–4. doi:10.1126/science.1058812. PMID 11303093. S2CID 38719808. (Retracted, see doi:10.1126/science.298.5595.961b, PMID 12416506)
- J. H. Schön; A. Dodabalapur; Ch. Kloc; B. Batlogg (2001). "High-Temperature Superconductivity in Lattice-Expanded C60". Science. 293 (5539): 2432–4. Bibcode:2001Sci...293.2432S. doi:10.1126/science.1064773. PMID 11533443. S2CID 28759665. (Retracted, see doi:10.1126/science.298.5595.961b, PMID 12416506)
- J. H. Schön; Ch. Kloc; A. Dodabalapur; B. Batlogg (2001). "Field-Effect Modulation of the Conductance of Single Molecules". Science. 294 (5549): 2138–40. doi:10.1126/science.1066171. PMID 11701891. S2CID 21937245. (Retracted, see doi:10.1126/science.298.5595.961b, PMID 12416506)

On December 20, 2002, Physical Review withdrew six articles written by Schön:

- J. H. Schön; Ch. Kloc; B. Batlogg (2001). "Hole transport in pentacene single crystals". Physical Review B. 63 (24) 245201. Bibcode:2001PhRvB..63x5201S. doi:10.1103/PhysRevB.63.245201. (Retracted, see doi:10.1103/PhysRevB.66.249903)
- J. H. Schön; Ch. Kloc; R. Laudise; B. Batlogg (1998). "Electrical properties of single crystals of rigid rodlike conjugated molecules". Physical Review B. 58 (19): 12952–12957. Bibcode:1998PhRvB..5812952S. doi:10.1103/PhysRevB.58.12952. (Retracted, see doi:10.1103/PhysRevB.66.249904)
- J. H. Schön; Ch. Kloc; B. Batlogg (2000). "Mobile iodine dopants in organic semiconductors". Physical Review B. 61 (16): 10803–10806. Bibcode:2000PhRvB..6110803S. doi:10.1103/PhysRevB.61.10803. (Retracted, see doi:10.1103/PhysRevB.66.249905)
- J. H. Schön; Ch. Kloc; D. Fichou; B. Batlogg (2001). "Conjugation length dependence of the charge transport in oligothiophene single crystals". Physical Review B. 64 (3) 035209. Bibcode:2001PhRvB..64c5209S. doi:10.1103/PhysRevB.64.035209. (Retracted, see doi:10.1103/PhysRevB.66.249906)
- J. H. Schön; Ch. Kloc; B. Batlogg (2001). "Low-temperature transport in high-mobility polycrystalline pentacene field-effect transistors". Physical Review B. 63 (12) 125304. Bibcode:2001PhRvB..63l5304S. doi:10.1103/PhysRevB.63.125304. (Retracted, see doi:10.1103/PhysRevB.66.249907)
- J. H. Schön; Ch. Kloc; B. Batlogg (2001). "Universal Crossover from Band to Hopping Conduction in Molecular Organic Semiconductors". Physical Review Letters. 86 (17): 3843–6. Bibcode:2001PhRvL..86.3843S. doi:10.1103/PhysRevLett.86.3843. PMID 11329338. (Retracted, see doi:10.1103/PhysRevLett.89.289902, PMID 12557900, Retraction Watch)

On February 24, 2003, Applied Physics Letters withdrew four articles written by Schön:

- J. H. Schön; Z. Bao (2002). "Nanoscale organic transistors based on self-assembled monolayers". Applied Physics Letters. 80 (5): 847. Bibcode:2002ApPhL..80..847S. doi:10.1063/1.1445804. (Retracted, see doi:10.1063/1.1553995)
- J. H. Schön; C. Kloc (2001). "Fast organic electronic circuits based on ambipolar pentacene field-effect transistors". Applied Physics Letters. 79 (24): 4043. Bibcode:2001ApPhL..79.4043S. doi:10.1063/1.1426684. (Retracted, see doi:10.1063/1.1556138)
- J. H. Schön (2001). "Plastic Josephson junctions". Applied Physics Letters. 79 (4): 2208–2210. Bibcode:2001ApPhL..79.2208S. doi:10.1063/1.1408277. (Retracted, see doi:10.1063/1.1556139, Retraction Watch)
- J. H. Schön; C. Kloc; B. Batlogg (2000). "Perylene: A promising organic field-effect transistor material". Applied Physics Letters. 77 (23): 3776. Bibcode:2000ApPhL..77.3776S. doi:10.1063/1.1329634. (Retracted, see doi:10.1063/1.1556140)

On March 5, 2003, Nature withdrew seven articles written by Schön:

- J. H. Schön; M. Dorget; F. C. Beuran; X. Z. Zu; E. Arushanov; C. Deville Cavellin; M. Laguës (2001). "Superconductivity in CaCuO_{2} as a result of field-effect doping". Nature. 414 (6862): 434–6. Bibcode:2001Natur.414..434S. doi:10.1038/35106539. PMID 11719801. S2CID 4389580. (Retracted, see doi:10.1038/nature01462, PMID 12621438, Retraction Watch)
- J. H. Schön; Ch. Kloc; T. Siegrist; M. Steigerwald; C. Svensson; B. Batlogg (2001). "Superconductivity in single crystals of the fullerene C70". Nature. 413 (6858): 831–3. Bibcode:2001Natur.413..831S. doi:10.1038/35101577. PMID 11677603. S2CID 4317548. (Retracted, see doi:10.1038/nature01463, PMID 12621439, Retraction Watch)
- J. H. Schön; H. Meng; Z. Bao (2001). "Self-assembled monolayer organic field-effect transistors". Nature. 413 (6857): 713–6. Bibcode:2001Natur.413..713S. doi:10.1038/35099520. PMID 11607026. S2CID 4409433. (Retracted, see doi:10.1038/nature01464, PMID 12621440, Retraction Watch)
- J. H. Schön; A. Dodabalapur; Z. Bao; Ch. Kloc; O. Schenker; B. Batlogg (2001). "Gate-induced superconductivity in a solution-processed organic polymer film". Nature. 410 (6825): 189–92. Bibcode:2001Natur.410..189S. doi:10.1038/35065565. PMID 11242074. S2CID 205014750. (Retracted, see doi:10.1038/nature01465, PMID 12621441, Retraction Watch)
- J. H. Schön; Ch. Kloc; B. Batlogg (2000). "Superconductivity at 52 K in hole-doped C60". Nature. 408 (6812): 549–52. Bibcode:2000Natur.408..549S. doi:10.1038/35046008. PMID 11117735. S2CID 4396847. (Retracted, see doi:10.1038/nature01466, PMID 12621442, Retraction Watch)
- J. H. Schön; Ch. Kloc; B. Batlogg (2000). "Superconductivity in molecular crystals induced by charge injection". Nature. 406 (6797): 702–4. Bibcode:2000Natur.406..702S. doi:10.1038/35021011. PMID 10963589. S2CID 207845002. (Retracted, see doi:10.1038/nature01467, PMID 12621443)
- J. H. Schön; Ch. Kloc; E. Bucher; B. Batlogg (2000). "Efficient organic photovoltaic diodes based on doped pentacene". Nature. 403 (6768): 408–10. Bibcode:2000Natur.403..408S. doi:10.1038/35000172. PMID 10667788. S2CID 4391485. (Retracted, see doi:10.1038/nature01468, PMID 12621444)

On March 20, 2003, Advanced Materials withdrew two articles written by Schön:

- J. H. Schön; H. Meng; Z. Bao (2002). "Self-Assembled Monolayer Transistors". Advanced Materials. 14 (4): 323–326. doi:10.1002/1521-4095(20020219)14:4<323::AID-ADMA323>3.0.CO;2-5. (Retracted)
- J. H. Schön; C. Kloc; J. Wildeman; G. Hadziinoannou (2001). "Gate-Induced Superconductivity in Oligophenylenevinylene Single Crystals". Advanced Materials. 13 (16): 1273–1274. doi:10.1002/1521-4095(200108)13:16<1273::AID-ADMA1273>3.0.CO;2-P. (Retracted)

On May 2, 2003, Science withdrew two more articles written by Schön:

- J. H. Schön; M. Dorget; F. C. Beuran; X. Z. Xu; E. Arushanov; M. Laguës; C. Deville Cavellin (2001). "Field-Induced Superconductivity in a Spin-Ladder Cuprate". Science. 293 (5539): 2430–2. Bibcode:2001Sci...293.2430S. doi:10.1126/science.1064204. PMID 11577230. S2CID 31378437. (Retracted, see doi:10.1126/science.300.5620.737c, PMID 12730577)
- J. H. Schön; E. G. Emberly; G. Kirczenow (2002). "A Single Molecular Spin Valve". Science. 296 (5567). doi:10.1126/science.1070563. (Retracted, see doi:10.1126/science.300.5620.737b, PMID 12730576)

== Further questionable journal articles ==
The retraction notices from February 24, 2003, in Applied Physics Letters relayed concerns about seven articles written by Schön and published in the Applied Physics Letters:

- J. H. Schön; Z. Bao (2002). "Organic insulator/semiconductor heterostructure monolayer transistors". Applied Physics Letters. 80 (2): 332. Bibcode:2002ApPhL..80..332S. doi:10.1063/1.1431697. S2CID 95860889.
- J. H. Schön; Ch. Kloc; A. Dodabalapur; B. Crone (2001). "Grain boundary transport and vapor sensing in α-sexithiophene". Applied Physics Letters. 79 (24): 3965. Bibcode:2001ApPhL..79.3965S. doi:10.1063/1.1423787.
- J. H. Schön; C. Kloc (2001). "Charge transport through a single tetracene grain boundary". Applied Physics Letters. 78 (24): 3821. Bibcode:2001ApPhL..78.3821S. doi:10.1063/1.1379986.
- J. H. Schön; C. Kloc (2001). "Organic metal–semiconductor field-effect phototransistors". Applied Physics Letters. 78 (22): 3538. Bibcode:2001ApPhL..78.3538S. doi:10.1063/1.1376666.
- J. H. Schön; C. Kloc; B. Batlogg (2000). "Efficient photovoltaic energy conversion in pentacene-based heterojunctions". Applied Physics Letters. 77 (16): 2473. Bibcode:2000ApPhL..77.2473S. doi:10.1063/1.1318234.
- J. H. Schön; C. Kloc; B. Batlogg (1999). "Reversible gas doping of bulk α-hexathiophene". Applied Physics Letters. 75 (11): 1556. Bibcode:1999ApPhL..75.1556S. doi:10.1063/1.124753.
- J. H. Schön; Ch. Kloc; R. A. Laudise; B. Batlogg (1998). "Surface and bulk mobilities of oligothiophene single crystals". Applied Physics Letters. 73 (24): 3574. Bibcode:1998ApPhL..73.3574S. doi:10.1063/1.122828.

The retraction notice from March 20, 2003, in Advanced Materials mentions concerns about another article written by Schön:

- J. H. Schön; C. Kloc; Z. Bao; B. Batlogg (2000). "Electron Transport in Fluorinated Copper-Phthalocyanine". Advanced Materials. 12 (20): 1539–1542. doi:10.1002/1521-4095(200010)12:20<1539::AID-ADMA1539>3.0.CO;2-S.

== See also ==
- Bogdanov affair (in 2002)
- Hwang affair (in 2005)
- Haruko Obokata (STAP cell controversy in 2014)
- List of experimental errors and frauds in physics
- List of scientific misconduct incidents
- Plastic Fantastic: How the Biggest Fraud in Physics Shook the Scientific World
- Scientific misconduct
- Victor Ninov
