= Bertram Batlogg =

Austrian physicist

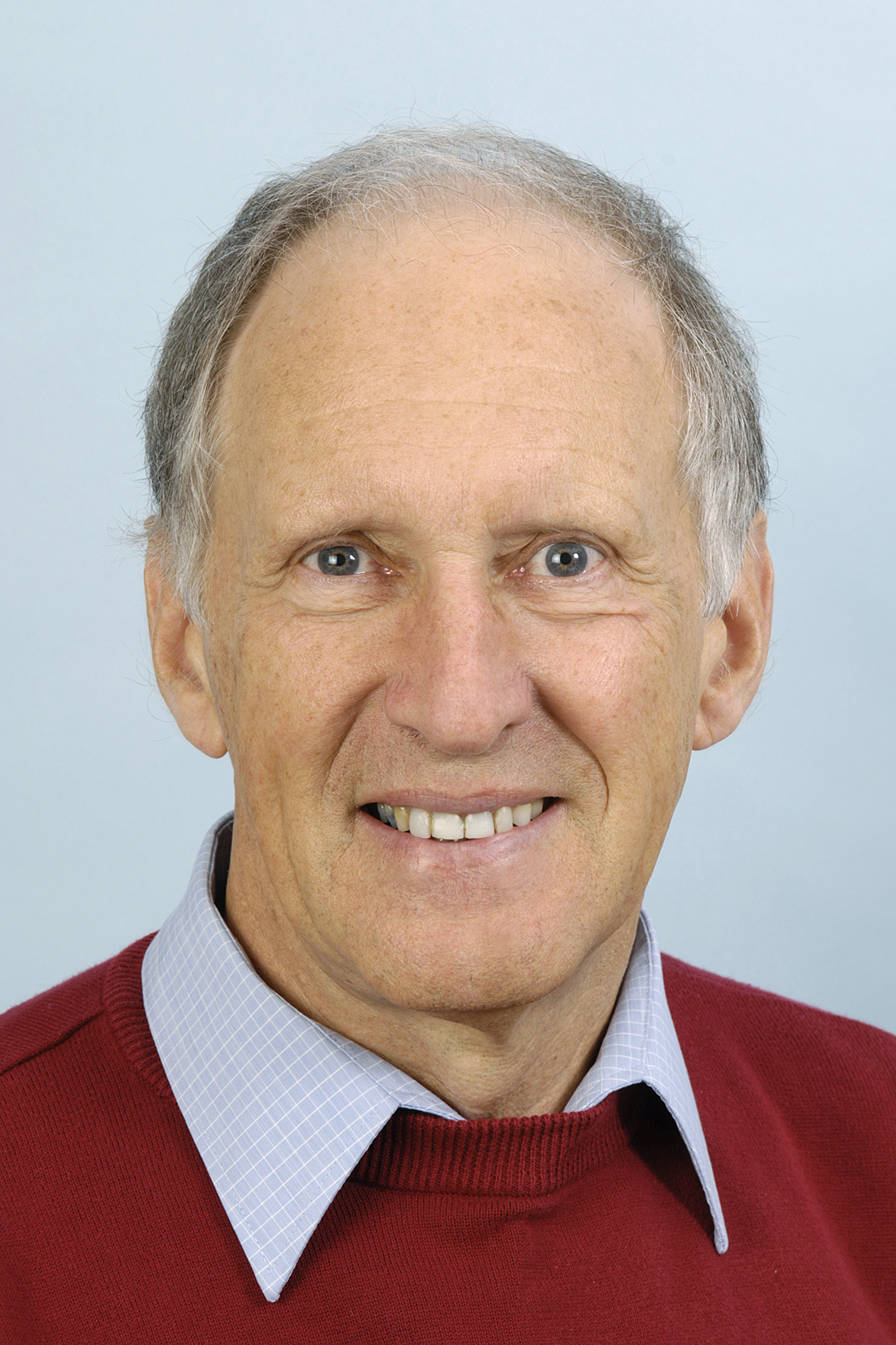
- Born: 1950 (age 75–76); Bludenz, Austria
- Education: ETH Zurich
- Known for: High-temperature superconductivity
- Awards: David Adler Lectureship Award (2000); Bernd T. Matthias Prize (1997); Science Prize of the State of Vorarlberg (2004)
- Scientific career
- Fields: Solid state physics, Material science
- Workplaces: ETH Zurich; Bell Labs
- Website: emeritus.pnm.ethz.ch

Bertram Josef Richard Batlogg (born 1950) is an Austrian physicist known for his research on high-temperature superconductivity.

Batlogg was born in the town of Bludenz in Austria. He is the great-grandson of the freedom fighter Johann Josef Batlogg. Batlogg was educated in the Swiss Federal Institute ETH Zurich, earning his diploma in physics in 1974, and his Ph.D. in 1979 working with mixed valence rare-earth compounds. He then joined Bell Labs, first as a post-doctoral researcher, and rising to be the head of the Solid State Physics and Materials Research Division at Bell Labs by 1986. After the discovery of high-temperature superconductors in 1987, Batlogg studied various cuprate compounds and together with Robert Cava discovered several transition metal oxide superconductors with high transition temperatures. In 1997, they won the Bernd Matthias Prize for their research on superconductivity.

Starting in 1998, Batlogg worked with Christian Kloc and Jan Hendrik Schön to study electronic properties of organic crystals. Over the next two years, the collaboration produced a series of ground-breaking papers regarding the properties of these materials. However, the experimental data provided by Schön were later shown to be fraudulent and several of the most important papers were retracted by the authors. The incident came to be known as the Schön scandal. Batlogg, Kloc and Schön's other collaborators were cleared in Sept 2002 of all scientific misconduct by an external committee appointed by Bell Labs. However, the committee questioned whether Batlogg met his professional responsibility to take "a sufficiently critical stance with regard to the research in question". This question was left unanswered by the committee. In Oct 2002 and after, Science, Physical Review, and Applied Physics Letters withdrew more than a dozen papers.

Batlogg joined ETH Zurich as a professor in 2000, where he remained until his retirement in 2016. The main research topics at ETH included superconductivity, physics of strongly correlated electrons and charge transport and trapping in molecular organic semiconductors. In the list of Most Cited Physicists published by the Institute for Scientific Information (ISI), covering 1981-June 1997, he is placed 4th with some 14000 citations. As of 2020, the Web of Science lists about 34000 citations and an h-index of 90+.
