= Julia Hsu =

American materials scientist

Julia Wan-Ping Hsu (Chinese: 徐婉萍) is an American materials scientist. In her research, she uses scanning probe microscopy to study the nanostructure, optics, and photoelectric properties of thin films and crystal surfaces, with particular application to solar cells, and has used nanotransfer printing to make electrical connections to single-molecule sensing devices. She is a professor of materials science and engineering at the University of Texas at Dallas, where she holds the Texas Instruments Distinguished Chair in Nanoelectronics.

== Education and career ==
Hsu graduated from Princeton University in 1985, summa cum laude, majoring in chemical engineering with a bachelor's thesis supervised by William Happer. She went to Stanford University for graduate study in physics, earning a master's degree in 1987 and a Ph.D. in 1991. Her dissertation, Novel Transport Properties of Two-Dimensional Superconductors, was supervised by Aharon Kapitulnik.

After postdoctoral research at AT&T Bell Laboratories, she worked as an assistant professor and tenured associate professor of physics at the University of Virginia from 1993 to 2001. In 1999, she resumed her position as a researcher at Bell Laboratories, by then part of Lucent. There, she was one of the first to uncover the fraudulent work of fellow Bell Labs researcher Jan Hendrik Schön in what became the Schön scandal. She moved in 2003 to Sandia National Laboratories, and in 2010 to her present position at the University of Texas at Dallas.

== Recognition ==
As an undergraduate at Princeton, Hsu won the 1985 LeRoy Apker Award of the American Physical Society (APS) for outstanding achievements in physics by an undergraduate student.

She was named a Fellow of the American Physical Society in 2001, after a nomination from the APS Division of Materials Physics, "for pioneering work in applying scanning probe microscopy techniques to elucidate the nanometer scale electronic and optical properties of novel materials, in particular the physics related to defects". In 2007 she was elected as a Fellow of the American Association for the Advancement of Science, and in 2011 she became a Fellow of the Materials Research Society, "for contributions to understanding relationships between materials structure and electronic properties at the nanoscale via careful experimentation and technique development, and for leadership of the materials research community".

She was named an Honorary Fellow of the Technical University of Munich in 2018, and an Honorary International Chair Professor at National Taipei University of Technology in 2020.
