= Nanotransfer printing =

Additive and high resolution metal printing technique

Nanotransfer printing (nTP) (compare with microcontact printing) is a purely additive and high resolution metal printing technique. It mainly relies on the principle of surface chemistry - chemically modified surfaces act as interfacial "release" or "glue" layers to aid in transfer printing nano-structured metal ink from relief features (a.k.a. "stamp") to a surface of interest. The nTP can be simply envisioned as "a process of signature stamping using rubber-stamp". In a rubber stamping, conventionally crafted signature/logo on a rubber stamp is transferred or replicated onto a paper surfaces using organic dye or ink while in nTP, nanolithographically created structures on silicon or PDMS "stamp" are transferred or printed on other surfaces such as glass or polymers using metal ink. nTP has found wide applications in various areas including electronics, chemical sensing, spintronics, and plasmonics. The technique has been successfully implemented for creating various functional structures having sub-100 nm spatial resolution. It was invented by Yueh-Lin Loo.
