= Sachdev–Ye–Kitaev model =

Solvable physics model

In condensed matter physics and black hole physics, the Sachdev–Ye–Kitaev (SYK) model is an exactly solvable model initially proposed by Subir Sachdev and Jinwu Ye, and later modified by Alexei Kitaev to the present commonly used form. The model is believed to bring insights into the understanding of strongly correlated materials and it also has a close relation with the discrete model of AdS/CFT. Many condensed matter systems, such as quantum dot coupled to topological superconducting wires, graphene flake with irregular boundary, and kagome optical lattice with impurities, are proposed to be modeled by it. Some variants of the model are amenable to digital quantum simulation, with pioneering experiments implemented in nuclear magnetic resonance.

== Model ==
Let $N$ be an integer and $q$ an even integer such that $2\leq q\leq N$, and consider a set of Majorana fermions $\psi_1,\dotsc,\psi_N$ which are fermion operators satisfying conditions:

1. Hermitian $\psi_i^{\dagger}=\psi_i$;
2. Anticommutation relation $\{\psi_i,\psi_j\}=\delta_{ij}$.

Let $J_{i_1 i_2 \cdots i_q}$ be random variables whose expectations satisfy:

1. $\mathbf{E}(J_{i_1i_2\cdots i_q})=0$;
2. $\mathbf{E}(J_{i_1i_2\cdots i_q}^2)= \frac{2^{q-1}}{q} \frac{\mathcal{J}^2(q-1)!}{N^{q-1}}$.

Then the $q$-body interacting SYK model is defined as

$$H_{\rm SYK}=\imath^{q/2}\sum_{1 \leq i_1 < \cdots < i_q \leq N}J_{i_1i_2\cdots i_q}\psi_{i_1}\psi_{i_2}\cdots\psi_{i_q}$$,

where the number of fermions $N$ is included in the variance to ensure the energy remains extensive. The $q$ dependence in the variance is such that a well-defined large $q$ limit may be taken, which yields a controlled $1/q$ expansion.

The most famous model is when $q=4$:

$$H_{\rm SYK}=-\sum_{i_1, \dotsc, i_4 = 1}^n J_{i_1i_2i_3 i_4}\psi_{i_1}\psi_{i_2}\psi_{i_3}\psi_{i_4}$$.

== See also ==
- Non-Fermi liquid
