= Hugh Osborn =

British physicist

Hugh Osborn FRS
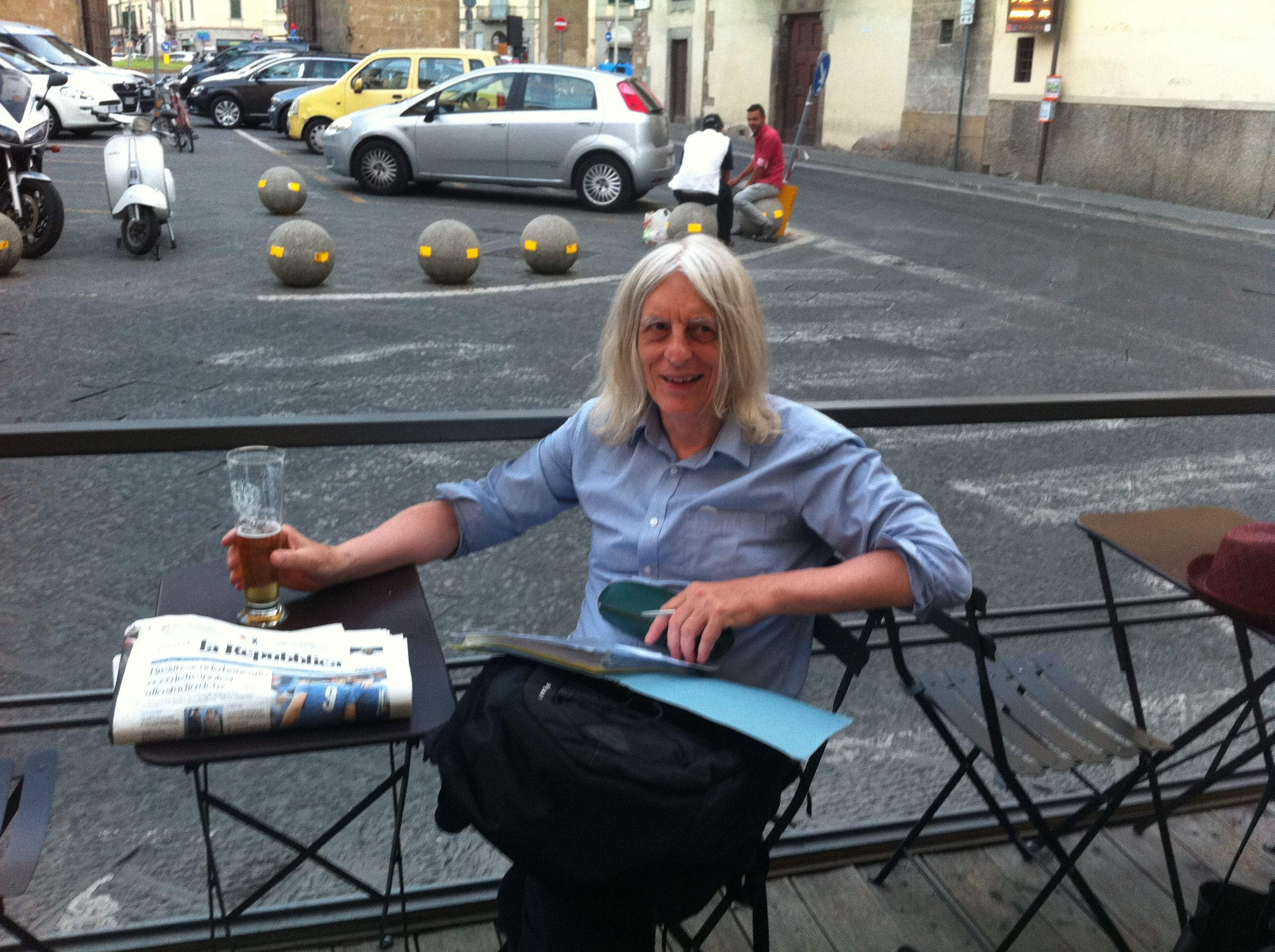
- Hugh Osborn at a conference in Florence, Italy
- Known for: Conformal Field Theory, C-theorem, Quantum field theory
- Scientific career
- Fields: Theoretical physicist
- Workplaces: Cambridge University
- Doctoral students: Johanna Erdmenger
- Website: http://www.damtp.cam.ac.uk/user/ho/

Hugh Osborn FRS is a British theoretical high-energy physicist and a professor emeritus at the University of Cambridge, Department of Applied Mathematics and Theoretical Physics. He is known for his work on Conformal Field Theory and Quantum Field Theory.

== Education ==
Osborn obtained his PhD in 1967 from the University College London. His PhD advisor was Sigurd Zienau.

== Career and research ==
After postdoctoral research positions at the University of Sussex and Queen Mary University of London, he became a professor first at the University of Glasgow and then in 1971 moved to the University of Cambridge where he remained ever since. He is a fellow of Trinity College. In April 2020 he was elected a Fellow of the Royal Society.

In 1989, Osborn obtained the first proof of the four-dimensional C-theorem, which was conjectured one year earlier by John Cardy. Osborn's proof was applicable to renormalization group flows which are perturbative, that is do not deviate far from the free quantum field theories, and was valid to all orders in perturbation theory. It provided a strong hint that the four-dimensional C-theorem must be universally valid, but a nonperturbative proof of this fact was found only in 2011 by Zohar Komargodski and Adam Schwimmer.

In 2001 and 2004, Osborn, in collaboration with Francis Dolan, obtained explicit expressions for the conformal blocks in four dimensional conformal field theories. Starting from 2008, these results found many important applications within the conformal bootstrap approach to conformal field theories.

=== Former PhD students ===
His former PhD students include:

- Francis Dolan
- Johanna Erdmenger, professor at the University of Würzburg
- Ian Jack, professor at the University of Liverpool
- Richard Ball, professor at the University of Edinburgh
- Tassos Petkou, professor at the Aristotle University of Thessaloniki
- Jeong-Hyuck Park, professor at Sogang University
