= Zohar Komargodski =

Israeli theoretical physicist

- זוהר קומרגודסקי
- Born: 10 March 1983 (age 43); Ukraine, Soviet Union
- Education: Tel-Aviv University; Weizmann Institute of Science
- Known for: a-theorem
- Awards: Gribov Medal (2013); New Horizons in Physics Prize (2013); Sackler Prize (2018)
- Scientific career
- Fields: Theoretical physics
- Workplaces: Simons Center for Geometry and Physics; Stony Brook University; Weizmann Institute of Science
- Thesis: (2008)
- Doctoral advisor: Ofer Aharony; Micha Berkooz

Zohar Komargodski (Hebrew: זוהר קומרגודסקי; born 10 March 1983) is an Israeli theoretical physicist who works on quantum field theory, including conformal field theories, gauge theories and supersymmetry.

Komargodski received his Ph.D. from the Weizmann Institute in 2008 and worked as a postdoctoral researcher at the Institute for Advanced Study in Princeton afterwards. He currently holds a professor position at the Simons Center for Geometry and Physics at Stony Brook University in New York.

== Research ==
In 2011 he and Adam Schwimmer from the Weizmann Institute proved a long-standing conjecture in quantum field theory, the a-theorem, conjectured in 1988 by John Cardy. Cardy's conjecture was a generalization of the c-theorem by Alexander Zamolodchikov (1986) for two-dimensional quantum field theories on higher dimensions. The c-theorem ensures the existence of a function that decreases monotonically with the flow of the renormalization group (RG) (a function of the coupling constants and energy scale), which assumes constant values independent of the energy scale at the fixed points of the RG. This means that cycles in the flow of the RG are excluded; the flow is irreversible. The theorem also makes statements about the number of degrees of freedom in quantum field theory depending on the energy scale. In 1988 Cardy proposed the existence of an analog function (a-function, as an integral of the expected value of the trace of the energy-momentum tensor over the four-dimensional sphere) in four dimensions. The a-function in four dimensions was proven to exist to all orders in perturbation theory in 1989 by Hugh Osborn. Komargodski and Schwimmer proved the existence of the a-function for four dimensions beyond perturbation theory. The application of the a-theorem enables connections to be made between predictions of a quantum field theory at low (observable) energies and high energies in the four-dimensional case relevant for physics.

Additional contributions include:

- Together with Alexander Zhiboedov, the universal large-spin limit of operators in Conformal Field Theories
- Contributions to supersymmetric localization, including the geometry of supersymmetric partition functions the Cardy limit, and the metric on the space of theories
- Anomalies and their consequences for dynamics of strongly coupled systems, including Yang-Mills theory in 3+1 dimensions (with Davide Gaiotto, Anton Kapustin, and Nathan Seiberg).
- Dualities and new phases of 2+1 dimensional theories.

== Honors and awards ==
In 2013 he received the New Horizons in Physics Prize and the Gribov Medal. In 2018 he was awarded the Sackler Prize in Physics. In 2021 he was awarded Tomassoni awards.
