= Pomeranchuk Prize =

International physics award

- Description: Award for theoretical physics
- Location: Moscow
- Country: Russia
- Presented by: Institute for Theoretical and Experimental Physics (ITEP)
- Website: www.itep.ru/science/pomeranchuk/

The Pomeranchuk Prize is an international award for theoretical physics, awarded annually since 1998 by the Institute for Theoretical and Experimental Physics (ITEP) from Moscow. It is named after Russian physicist Isaak Yakovlevich Pomeranchuk, who together with Landau established the Theoretical Physics Department of the Institute.

== Laureates ==
- 2026 Augusto Sagnotti and Grigori Vilkovisky
- 2025 Igor Dmitriyevich Novikov and Mikhail Shaposhnikov
- 2024 Andrei Linde and Igor Tyutin
- 2023 Yakir Aharonov and Arkady Tseytlin
- 2022 Luciano Maiani and Irina Aref'eva
- 2021 Larry D. McLerran and Alexei Starobinsky
- 2020 Sergio Ferrara and Mikhail Andrejewitsch Vasiliev
- 2019 Roger Penrose and Vladimir S. Popov
- 2018 Giorgio Parisi and Lev Pitaevskii
- 2017 Igor Klebanov and Juri Moissejewitsch Kagan
- 2016 Curtis J. Callan and Yuri A. Simonov
- 2015 Stanley J. Brodsky and Victor Fadin
- 2014 Leonid Keldysh and Alexander Zamolodchikov
- 2013 Mikhail Shifman and Andrei Slavnov
- 2012 Juan Martín Maldacena and Spartak Belyaev
- 2011 Heinrich Leutwyler and Semyon Gershtein
- 2010 André Martin and Valentine Zakharov
- 2009 Nicola Cabibbo and Boris Ioffe
- 2008 Leonard Susskind and Lev Okun
- 2007 Alexander Belavin and Yoichiro Nambu
- 2006 Vadim Kuzmin and Howard Georgi
- 2005 Iosif Khriplovich and Arkady Vainshtein
- 2004 Alexander F. Andreev and Alexander Polyakov
- 2003 Valery Rubakov and Freeman Dyson
- 2002 Ludvig Faddeev and Bryce Seligman DeWitt
- 2001 Lev Lipatov and Tullio Regge
- 2000 Evgenii Feinberg and James Daniel Bjorken
- 1999 Karen Ter-Martirosian and Gabriele Veneziano
- 1998 Aleksander Ilyich Akhiezer and Sidney Drell

== See also ==
- List of physics awards
