= Mikhail Shifman =

American physicist

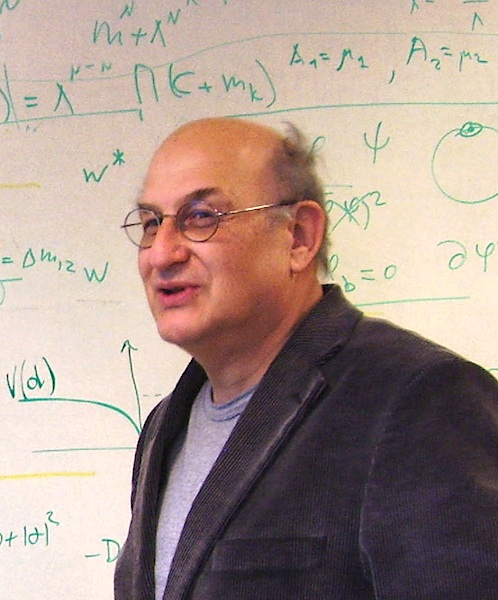
- Born: April 4, 1949 (age 77); Riga, Latvia
- Education: Moscow Institute of Physics and Technology
- Known for: Penguin mechanism Quantum Chromodynamics; KSVZ axion Nonperturbative supersymmetry Supersymmetric gauge theories
- Awards: Humboldt Research Award (1993); Sakurai Prize (1999) Lilienfeld Prize (2006); Chaires Blaise Pascal (2007); Pomeranchuk Prize (2013); ICTP Dirac Medal (2016); Elected to the National Academy of Sciences (2018); Fulbright Distinguished Scholar (2022) Regents Professor of the University of Minnesota (2024)
- Scientific career
- Fields: Theoretical High Energy Physics
- Workplaces: William I. Fine Theoretical Physics Institute, University of Minnesota; Institute for Theoretical and Experimental Physics (ITEP)
- Academic advisors: Boris L. Ioffe, Arkady Vainshtein, Valentine I. Zakharov

Mikhail "Misha" Arkadyevich Shifman (Russian: Михаи́л Арка́дьевич Ши́фман; born 4 April 1949) is a theoretical physicist (high energy physics), formerly at the Institute for Theoretical and Experimental Physics, Moscow, currently Ida Cohen Fine Professor of Theoretical Physics, William I. Fine Theoretical Physics Institute, University of Minnesota.

== Scientific contributions ==
Shifman is known for a number of basic contributions to quantum chromodynamics, the theory of strong interactions, and to understanding of supersymmetric gauge dynamics. The most important results due to M. Shifman are diverse and include (i) the discovery of the penguin mechanism in the flavor-changing weak decays (1974); (ii) introduction of the gluon condensate and development of the SVZ sum rules relating properties of the low-lying hadronic states to the vacuum condensates (1979); (iii) introduction of the invisible (aka KSVZ) axion (1980) (iv) first exact results in supersymmetric Yang–Mills theories (NSVZ beta function, gluino condensate,1983–1988); (v) heavy quark theory based on the operator product expansion (1985–1995); (vi) critical domain walls (D-brane analogs) in super-Yang-Mills (1996); (vii) non-perturbative (exact) planar equivalence between super-Yang–Mills and orientifold non-supersymmetric theories (2003); (viii) non-Abelian flux tubes and confined monopoles (2004 till present). His paper with A. Vainshtein and Zakharov on the SVZ sum rules is among the all-time top cited papers in high-energy physics.

== Honors and awards ==
Mikhail Shifman received the Alexander-von-Humboldt Award in 1993, the Sakurai Prize in 1999, the Ida Cohen Fine Chair in Theoretical Physics and the Julius Edgar Lilienfeld Prize in 2006; he is the 2007 laureate of the Blaise Pascal Chair, 2013 Pomeranchuk Prize and he was awarded the 2016 Dirac Medal and Prize of the ICTP. In May 2018, M. Shifman was elected to the US National Academy of Sciences. 2022: Fulbright Distinguished Scholar. In 2024, Mikhail Shifman was appointed as the University of Minnesota Regents Professor. He is also a Fellow of the American Physical Society.

== Political positions ==
In February-March 2022, he signed two open letters by Russian scientists condemning the 2022 Russian invasion of Ukraine.

== Selected books ==
- M. Shifman, ed. (1992). Vacuum Structure and QCD Sum Rules. Amsterdam: North Holland. ISBN 978-0-444-89745-9.
- Shifman, M. (1999). ITEP Lectures on Particle Physics and Field Theory (2 volumes). Singapore: World Scientific. ISBN 978-981-02-2639-8.
- Mikhail A. Shifman (2001). "Foreword and Notes from the Editor". In Mikhail A. Shifman (ed.). At The Frontier of Particle Physics: Handbook of QCD (On the occasion of the 75th birthday of Professor Boris Ioffe, in 3 volumes). Singapore: World Scientific. doi:10.1142/9789812810458_fmatter. ISBN 981-02-4445-2.
- M. Shifman, ed. (2007). Felix Berezin, The Life and Death of the Mastermind of Supermathematics. Singapore: World Scientific. ISBN 978-981270-532-7.
- Shifman, M.; Yung, A. (2009). Supersymmetric Solitons. Cambridge: Cambridge University Press.
- Shifman, M. (2012). Advanced Topics in Quantum Field Theory. Cambridge: Cambridge University Press. ISBN 978-0-521-19084-8.
- M. Shifman, ed. (2015). Physics in a Mad World. Singapore: World Scientific. doi:10.1142/9281. ISBN 978-981-4619-28-8.
- Shifman, M. (2017). Standing together in Troubled Times. Singapore: World Scientific. doi:10.1142/10308. ISBN 978-981-320-100-2.
- A. Gottvald, M. Shifman (2018). George Placzek - A Nuclear Physicist's Odyssey. Singapore: World Scientific. doi:10.1142/10900. ISBN 978-981-3236-91-2.
- M. Shifman (2019). Quantum Field Theory II. Singapore: World Scientific. doi:10.1142/10825. ISBN 978-981-3234-18-5. S2CID 125450986.
- M. Shifman (2019). Love and Physics - the Peierlses. Singapore: World Scientific. doi:10.1142/11266. ISBN 978-981-3279-90-2. S2CID 126288758.
- Shifman, M. (2022). Advanced Topics in Quantum Field Theory, Secon Edition. Cambridge: Cambridge University Press. ISBN 978-1-108-84042-2.

== See also ==
- KSVZ axion (Kim–Shifman–Vainshtein–Zakharov axion model)
- SVZ sum rules (Shifman–Vainshtein–Zakharov sum rules)
- Penguin mechanism
- QCD vacuum
- NSVZ beta function
- Gluon condensation
- Gluino condensation
- Critical (BPS saturated) domain walls in super-Yang–Mills
- Non-Abelian flux tubes in super-Yang–Mills
- Planar equivalence in non-Abelian orientifold theories
