= Vyacheslav Rychkov =

Theoretical physicist and mathematician (b. 1975)

Vyacheslav (Slava) Rychkov
- Born: May 27, 1975 (age 51); Samara, Russia
- Education: Moscow Institute of Physics and Technology (B.S. and M.S., 1996); Princeton University (Ph.D., 2002)
- Awards: New Horizons in Physics Prize (2014); Prix Mergier-Bourdeix (2019)
- Scientific career
- Workplaces: Institut des Hautes Études Scientifiques
- Website: slava.ihes.fr

Vyacheslav Rychkov (called Slava Rychkov, Russian Вячеслав Рычков, transcription Vyacheslav Rychkov; born 27 May 1975 in Samara, Russia) is a Russian-Italian-French theoretical physicist and mathematician.

== Career ==
In 1996, Rychkov obtained his diploma (B.S., M.S.) from the Moscow Institute of Physics and Technology. From 1996 to 1998 he studied at the University of Jena. He received his doctorate in mathematics from Princeton University, under the supervision of Elias Stein, in 2002 with a thesis titled "Estimates for Oscillatory Integral Operators". Alexander Polyakov was his unofficial supervisor. He was a post-doctoral fellow at the University of Amsterdam (2002-2005) and at the Scuola Normale Superiore in Pisa, where he became assistant professor in 2007. In 2009 he became a professor of physics at the University of Paris VI and a member of the Laboratory of Theoretical Physics at the École Normale Supérieure in Paris. Since 2012 to 2017 he was a staff member of the Department of Theoretical Physics at CERN. He has been a Mitsubishi Heavy Industries Professor of High Energy Physics at École Normale Supérieure in Paris since 2016 and in 2017 he became a permanent professor at the Institut des Hautes Études Scientifiques.

== Research ==
Slava Rychkov’s research interests mostly concern problems of theoretical physics to which the methods of quantum field theory and conformal field theory are applicable. He is the deputy director of the international collaboration on the nonperturbative bootstrap financed by the Simons Foundation.

== Awards ==
Between 2012 and 2017 he was a Junior Member of l’Institut Universitaire de France.

In 2014 he received the New Horizons in Physics Prize “For developing new techniques in conformal field theory, reviving the conformal bootstrap program for constraining the spectrum of operators and the structure constants in 3D and 4D CFT’s.”

He was the 2019 laureate of the Grand Prix Mergier-Bourdeix of the French Academy of Sciences for his work on the conformal bootstrap.
