= Erdmenger =

Erdmenger is a German-language surname. Notable people with the surname include:

- Hans Erdmenger (1903–1943), German Kriegsmarine officer
- Johanna Erdmenger (born 1969), German physicist
- Rudolf Erdmenger (1911–1991), German mechanical engineer
