= Alexey Anselm =

Russian theoretical physicist (1934–1998)

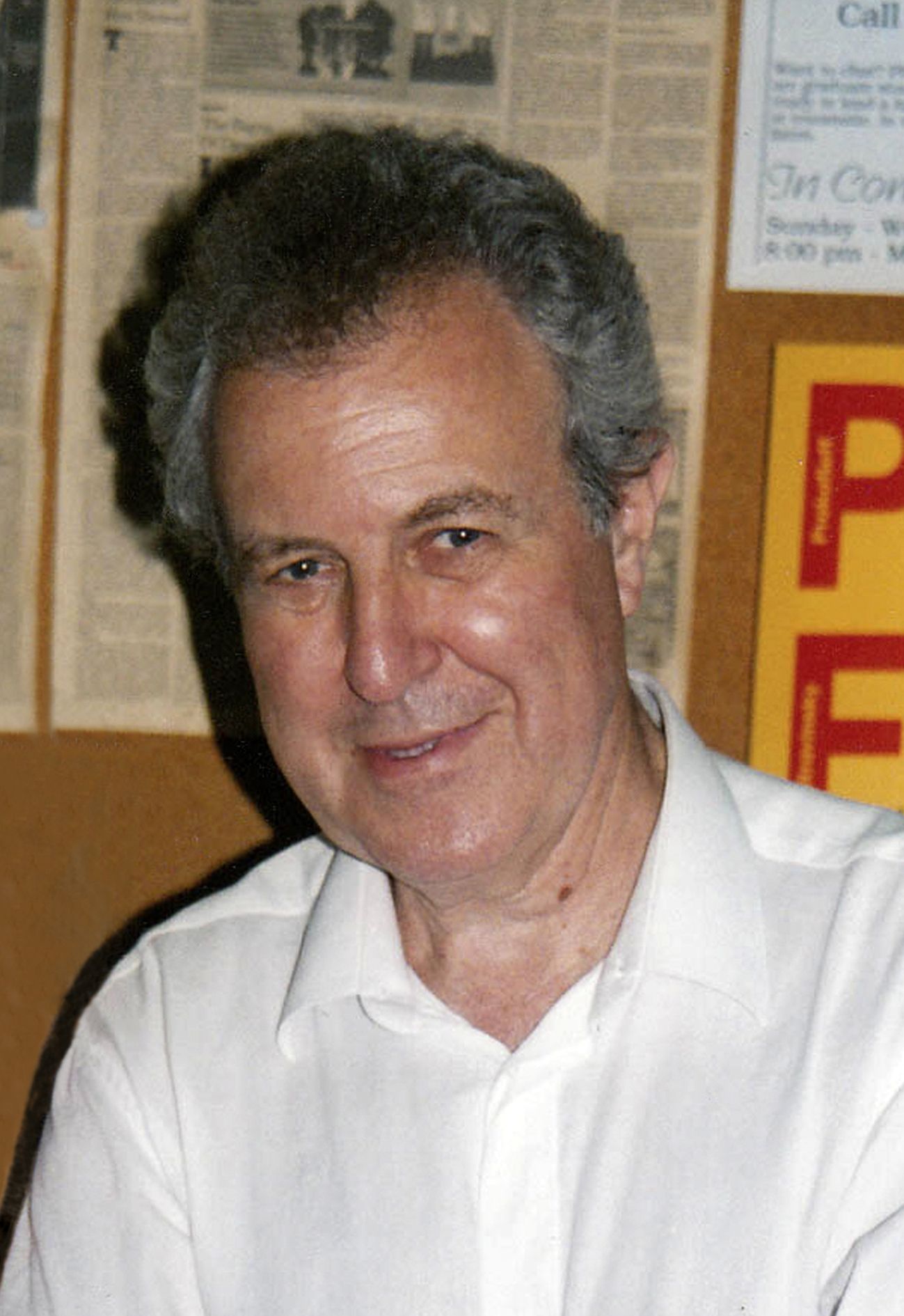
- Born: Alexey Andreevich Anselm; 1 July 1934; Leningrad, Soviet Union
- Died: 24 August 1998 (aged 64); Boston, U.S.
- Resting place: Newton Cemetery, 791 Walnut Street, Newton, Massachusetts
- Education: Leningrad State University (diploma, 1956); Leningrad Physico-Technical Institute (D.Sc., 1969)
- Known for: Director of the B.P. Konstantinov St. Petersburg Nuclear Physics Institute (1992-1994); The author of the discovery of non-universality of the Landau pole in Quantum field theory, contributions to the theory.
- Spouse: Ludmila Anselm (married 1956; 1 child)
- Scientific career
- Fields: Theoretical physics
- Workplaces: Leningrad Physico-Technical Institute; B.P. Konstantinov St. Petersburg Nuclear Physics Institute
- Doctoral advisor: Karen Ter-Martirosian
- Other academic advisors: Lev Landau
- Doctoral students: Dmitri Igorewitsch Djakonow

Alexey Andreevich Anselm (Russian: Алексей Андреевич Ансельм, 1 July 1934 – 24 August 1998) was a Russian theoretical physicist, Doctor of Physical and Mathematical Sciences, professor, director (1992–1994) of the B.P. Konstantinov Petersburg Nuclear Physics Institute (PNPI), member of: the Russian and American Physical Society, the executive committee of the Nuclear Physics Branch of the Russian Academy of Sciences, the editorial board of the Russian journal “Yadernaya Fizika”.

Anselm was known for his discovery of non-universality of the Landau pole in Quantum field theory, contributions to the theory of complex angular momenta, works on the Quark model, Spontaneous symmetry breaking, mechanisms of CP violation, modifications of the Standard Model, Cosmology, and the development of a simple model for the proton spin crisis.

== Biography ==
Anselm was born into a family of physicists. His father Andrey Ivanovich Anselm (1905–1988) was a Doctor of Physical and Mathematical Sciences, professor; his mother Irina Victorovna Motchan (1903–1978) also was a Doctor of Physical and Mathematical Sciences. Both parents worked as research scientists at the Leningrad Institute of Semiconductors.

Aleksey Anselm graduated summa cum laude from the Leningrad State University (LSU) in 1956 and enrolled at the Leningrad Physico-Technical Institute (Phystech) of the Academy of Sciences of the USSR. He joined the Nuclear and Particle theory group of professor I. M. Shmushkevich in the Theory Department. It did not take a long time for such leading Soviet theorists as Lev Landau, Karen Ter-Martirosian and Vladimir Gribov to recognize Alexey Anselm as a talented and capable physicist. Weak and strong interactions of elementary particles became the principal field of his scientific research.

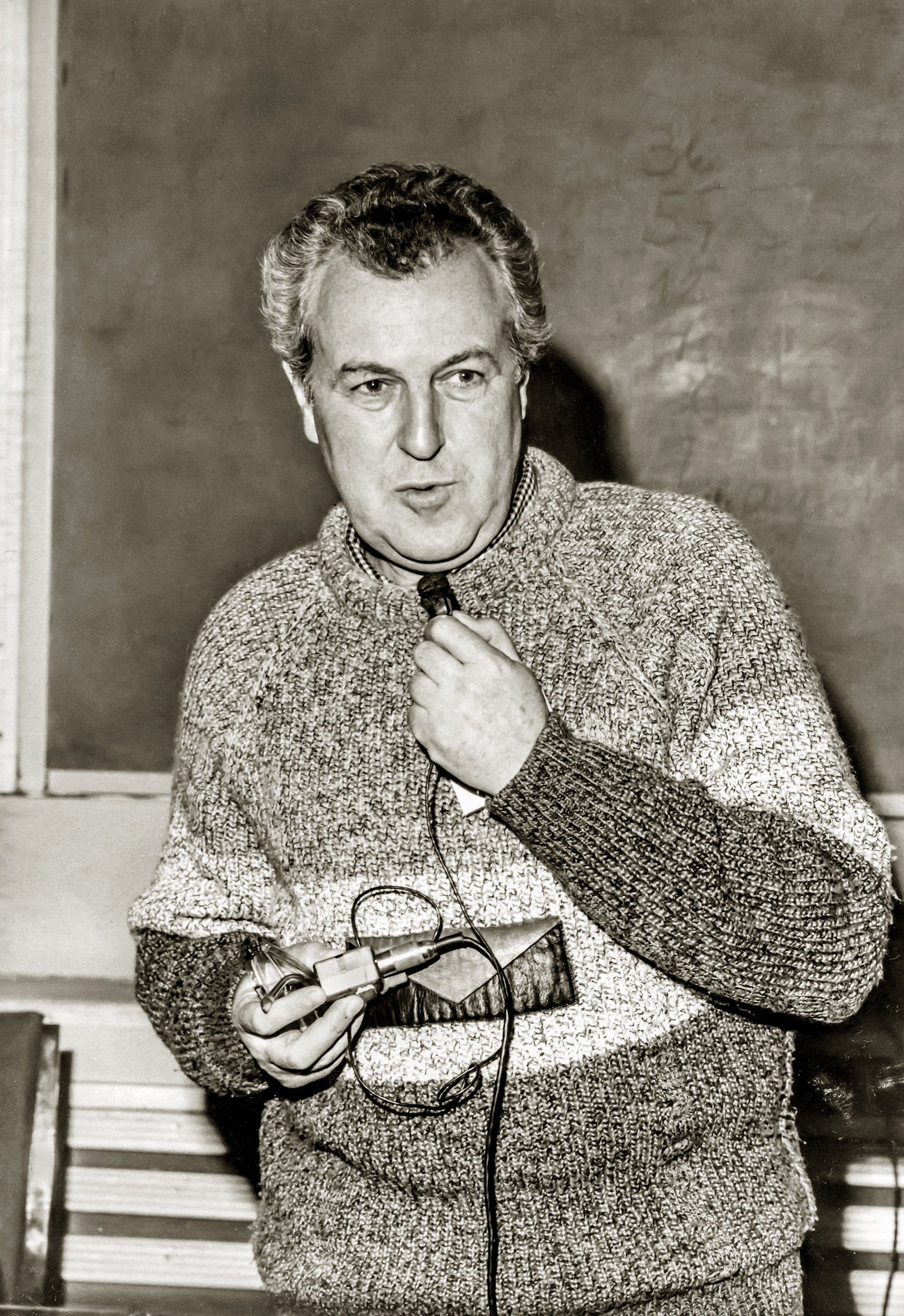
Director of the B.P. Konstantinov Petersburg Nuclear Physics Institute (PNPI) Alexey Andreevich Anselm

In 1971 the Theory Department of Phystech was transferred to Gatchina, where it joined the B.P. Konstantinov Leningrad Nuclear Physics Institute of the USSR Academy of Science (LNPI). All further scientific activity of A. Anselm developed in this institute. Besides research, since 1974 A. Anselm was also a professor at the Physics Department of the Leningrad State University where he was teaching graduate courses.

In the early 1980s Anselm became a head of the LNPI Theoretical Department, and in 1992 he was elected director of the LNPI. The years immediately after collapse of the Soviet Union were perhaps the most difficult period in the history of this renowned scientific institution.

Unfailing determination by Anselm enabled the institute to survive the hard times. In 1994 a serious illness forced Alexey Anselm to retire. He endured hard medical treatments both in St. Petersburg and in Boston (US), where his daughter had moved by that time. At the end medicine was powerless, and he died in the early fall of 1998. Anselm is buried at the town cemetery of Newton, at the outskirts of Boston, US.

== Scientific contributions ==
- Anselm made significant contributions to quantum field theory and the theory of strong and weak interactions. He actively worked with graduate students and many of his students became internationally recognized theorists in their own right.

In the beginning of 1950s particle physics theory was in deep crisis after L. Landau, A. Abrikosov and I. Khalatinikov discovered that quantum field theory predicts nullification of interaction in quantum electrodynamics. This so called «Moscow Zero» means that quantum field theory, the principal tool of theoretical research in particle physics is not self-consistent. Landau and his school put forward widely accepted arguments that the «Moscow zero» takes place in any field theory and thus any field theory is doomed. In 1959 young Anselm discovered that there is no nullification of interaction in a certain two-dimensional model with four-fermion interaction. This means that the «Moscow zero» is non-universal and self-consistent quantum field theories do exist. Anselm’s discovery opened a path to constructing a field theory of fundamental particles and their interactions. In modern language Anselm was the first to discover a phenomenon later called «asymptotic freedom» and fundamentally important for the modern quantum field theory:

Still, this first major achievement of young A. Anselm did not receive due attention of the Soviet physicists, and 15 years later the "asymptotic freedom” phenomenon was re-discovered by western scientists.

«Anselm’s work dates back to rather gloomy days for field theorists, after Landau’s discovery of the so-called "zero charge" or, infrared freedom in modern terminology.» Anselm’s Discovery of the Gross–Neveu model in M. Shifman Under the spell of Landau 2013, chapter 11, pp.488-490.

- In the early 1960s in search for an alternative to quantum field theory physicists turned to the theory of complex angular momenta. This approach is based on analyticity and unitarity. The principal contributions to the development of this approach were made by V. Gribov and his colleagues, including Anselm. Into cooperation with Y. Azimov, V. Anisovich, G. Danilov, I. Dyatlov, V. Schekhter Anselm obtained the results that received worldwide renown. Among these results are
  - The theory of production of three particles near the threshold;
  - Studies of Regge poles in perturbation theory;
  - Prediction of the interference minima in a cross section of elastic collisions at large angles, and much more.
- At a later stage the field theory took again the central stage in the theoretical research. Anselm started to work on gauge theories, the theoretical basis of the future Standard Model of strong, electromagnetic and weak interactions. His emphasis was on the problem of spontaneous symmetry breaking in gauge theories interactions. A. Anselm proposed a new mechanism of symmetry breaking in electroweak theory due to “radiative” interaction of heavy quarks. In collaboration with his students D. Diakonov, A. Johansen, and N. Uraltsev he explored whether the asymptotic freedom of gauge theory can be combined with the Higgs phase which prevents the infrared pole, whether an electron mass can be obtained as a radiative correction to the muon mass, whether the observed experimentally CP violation is compatible with the CP violation induced by the complexity of the Higgs sector.
- Together with N. Uraltsev, Anselm proposed and studied in detail possible existence of massless or very light Higgs particles. Anselm invented a new kind of one or more massless Goldstone bosons which he christened «arions». Would these particle be found in nature is today an open question.
- Independently of the better known work of the future Nobel Prize winner Gerard 't Hooft Alexey Anselm simultaneously put forth the principle of the quantum anomalies cancellation at the level of constituent particles,
- In the last decade of the 20th century, the most cited works by Anselm (partly done jointly with A. Johansen, L. Lipatov, M. Ryskin, A. Shuvaev) were devoted to production of coherent pion fields in ultrarelativistic collisions of heavy ions. These fields are known today as "disoriented chiral condensate" (DCC). The possibility of DCC existence is widely discussed in connection with the experiments at the Relativistic Heavy Ion Collider (RHIC) at the Brookhaven National Laboratory.
- Anselm (together with A. Johansen) suggested a natural dynamic mechanism explaining the doublet-triplet hierarchy within supersymmetric grand unified models of electroweak and strong interactions. He has made important contributions to the understanding of the axial anomalies in supersymmetric theories.

== Social activities ==
- Anselm was a chairman of the Committee on Basic Nuclear Physics at the Russian Ministry of Science, Higher Education and Technical Policy. The aim of the committee was to identify and support the most promising research projects in Russia. Despite the limited resources available for the Committee A. Anselm managed to support many promising scientific projects.
- For many years Anselm organized the scientific program of the annual «Winter School» of the St. Petersburg Nuclear Physics Institute. Thanks to his dedication and talent, each Winter School became an inordinate event.
- Anselm was an active promoter and popularizer of the latest achievements of science, especially in physics and cosmology. He wrote for the Russian magazine «Zvezda», and since 1991 regularly appeared on the air of the Russian Service of BBC in the «Paradigm» programs with Yuri Kolker. Later, some of the talks between J. Kolker and A. Anselm were featured in the article entitled «How this world is arranged».

== Publications ==
- А.А. Anselm (1959). "A model of field theory with non vanishing renormalized charge" (PDF). Sov. Phys. JETP. 9 (36): 608–611.
- V.V. Anisovich; А.А. Anselm; V.N. Gribov (1962). "On the theory of reactions with production of three low-energy particles". Nucl. Phys. 38: 132–145. Bibcode:1962NucPh..38..132A. doi:10.1016/0029-5582(62)91023-4.
- Ya. I. Azimov; А.А. Anselm (1963). "Regge poles and asymptotic behavior of amplitudes in perturbation theory" (PDF). Sov. Phys. JETP. 17 (2): 464–471.]
- А.А. Anselm; I.T. Dyatlov (1969). "On oscillations in momentum transfer of the high-energy elastic PP scattering cross sections". Sov. J. Nucl. Phys. 9: 242–247.
- А.А. Anselm (1979). "Quark strong interactions as a possible mechanism of symmetry breaking in weak interactions". Phys. Lett. B. 87 (4): 371–374. Bibcode:1979PhLB...87..371A. doi:10.1016/0370-2693(79)90556-2.
- А.А. Anselm; N. G. Uraltsev (1981). "A second massless axion?". Phys. Lett. B. 114 (1): 39–41. doi:10.1016/0370-2693(82)90011-9.
- А.А. Anselm (1981). "The problem of particle generations and the quint structure of leptons and quarks" (PDF). Sov. Phys. JETP. 53 (1): 23–32. Bibcode:1981JETP...53...23A.
- А.А. Anselm; А.А. Johansen (1988). "SUSY GUT with automatic doublet-triplet hierarchy". Phys. Lett. B. 200 (3): 331–334. Bibcode:1988PhLB..200..331A. doi:10.1016/0370-2693(88)90781-2.
- А.А. Anselm (1989). "Classical states of the chiral field and nuclear collisions at very high energy". Phys. Lett. B. 217 (1–2): 169–172. Bibcode:1989PhLB..217..169A. doi:10.1016/0370-2693(89)91537-2.
- А.А. Anselm; А.А. Johansen (1989). "Radiative corrections to the axial anomaly". Sov. Phys. JETP. 69 (4): 670–674. doi:10.1007/BF02769535. S2CID 120098337.
- А.А. Anselm (1990). "Search for massless Higgs-Goldstone bosons" (PDF). In J. Tran Thanh Vân (ed.). Z^{0} Physics: Proceedings of the XXVth Rencontre de Moriond, held March 4–11, 1990, in Les Arcs, Savoie, France. Moriond Particle Physics Meetings. Gif-sur-Yvette Cedex, France: Éditions Frontières. pp. 291–300. Bibcode:1990zp...conf..291A.
- А.А. Anselm; M. G. Ryskin; A. G.Shuvaev (1996). "Production of classical pion field and/or disoriented chiral condensate". Z. Phys. A. 354 (3): 333–341. doi:10.1007/BF02769535. S2CID 120098337.
