= Larry D. McLerran =

American physicist

- Born: United States
- Occupations: Physicist and academic
- Awards: Herman Feshbach Prize, American Physical Society (2015); Pomeranchuk Prize, Institute for Theoretical and Experimental Physics (2021)

Academic background
- Education: B.S., Physics; PhD, Physics
- Alma mater: University of Washington

Larry D. McLerran is an American physicist and an academic. He is a professor of physics at the University of Washington.

McLerran is most known for his work on particle and nuclear physics, primarily focusing on the Color Glass condensate, the Quark–gluon plasma, and Quarkyonic Matter.

McLerran is the recipient of the 2015 Herman Feshbach Prize in Theoretical Physics and the 2021 Pomeranchuk Prize from the Institute for Theoretical and Experimental Physics. He is a Foreign Member of the Finnish Academy of Arts and Sciences.

== Education ==
McLerran completed his Bachelor of Science in physics from the University of Washington in 1971. Later in 1975, he obtained a PhD in Physics from the same institution.

== Career ==
McLerran was a postdoctoral research associate at the Massachusetts Institute of Technology from 1975 to 1978. Following that, he became a postdoctoral research associate at the Stanford Linear Accelerator Center from 1978 to 1980. In 1980, he rejoined the University of Washington as an assistant professor, a role he held until 1984. He was subsequently promoted to the position of associate professor in 1984. He became a scientist in the Theory Division of Fermi National Accelerator Center from 1984 to 1989 and was also an adjunct associate professor at the University of Illinois from 1984 to 1989. He joined the University of Minnesota where he served as a professor from 1988 to 2000. In addition to his professorial role, he held concurrent appointments as a member of the Fine Theoretical Physics Institute at the University of Minnesota from 1989 to 2000 and as visiting professor at the Nordic Institute of Theoretical Physics from 1996 to 1998. From 1999 to 2016, he was a senior scientist at Brookhaven National Laboratory. Since 2016, he has been serving as a professor of physics at the University of Washington and a senior fellow of the Institute for Nuclear Theory.

McLerran served as the director of the Theoretical Physics Institute from 1989 to 1992 at the University of Minnesota. From 1999 to 2004, he was theory group leader of the Nuclear Theory Group at Brookhaven National Laboratory, and from 2003 to 2016 he was theory group leader of the Riken Brookhaven Center at Brookhaven National Laboratory. From 2016 to 2022, he held the position of director at the Institute for Nuclear Theory at the University of Washington.

== Research ==
McLerran has conducted research into the characteristics of ultra-relativistic nuclear collisions and the properties of super dense strongly interacting matter. He has authored numerous publications spanning the areas of particle physics, nuclear physics, and Quantum chromodynamics including articles in peer-reviewed journals.

=== Ultra-relativistic heavy ion collisions and the quark gluon plasma ===
McLerran's work on the Quark Gluon Plasma and the theory of heavy ion collisions has made contributions to the field of nuclear and particle physics. His early research explored the theoretical concept of deconfinement of quarks in dense matter. He computed the energy density of a quark gas to the first order where the density dependence of interactions is important, and explored the possibility that such matter may occur in neutron stars. Furthermore, he showed the existence of a confinement-deconfinement phase transition in a Yang-Mills theory of gluons using Monte-Carlo numerical methods. His work also established that energy densities may be large enough and time scales long enough to form a Quark Gluon Plasma in heavy ion collisions. Additionally, he investigated the emission of photons and dileptons from a quark-gluon plasma and revealed that the emission rates governing the release of photons and dileptons from a quark-gluon plasma are intricately linked to the thermal anticipated value of a correlation function involving electromagnetic currents.

=== Color glass condensate and the glasma ===
McLerran's Color Glass Condensate research illustrated the importance of color electric and magnetic fields inside of strongly interacting particles responsible for particle interactions at high energies. One of the major focuses of his research for the Electron Ion Collider being built at Brookhaven National Laboratory is to explore the consequences of such color electric and magnetic fields. He and Raju Venugopalan constructed the McLerran-Veungopalan model of strong color electric fields, and then formulated a mathematical equation that delineated the quantum evolution of the effective theory concerning the Color Glass Condensate (CGC). Focusing on nonlinear gluon evolution in the color glass condensate, his study enhanced comprehension of small-x hadronic physics in the high gluon density regime by deriving a functional Fokker-Planck equation and presented the renormalization group equation (RGE) for the Color Glass Condensate, governing its rapidity evolution. The Color Glass Condensate provided initial conditions for the matter formed in heavy ion collisions, and the early time evolution of such matter towards the formation of a Quark Gluon Plasma was the subject of his work on the Glasma.

=== Topological excitations and high density matter ===
McLerran used properties of topological excitations, instantons and sphalerons, in electroweak theory to compute the rate of electroweak baryon number violation. With Kharzeev and Warringa, he developed insight into the effect of topological anomalous effects in strongly interacting theory, the Chiral Magnetic Effect wherein a polarize system and electric field is generated parallel to an externally applied magnetic field.

=== Quarkyonic matter ===
McLerran and Pisarski proposed the existence of Quarkyonic Matter, a form of high density matter with quark confinement, yet which largely behaves like a gas of unconfined quarks, which may exist at densities intermediate between that of nuclear matter and that of a deconfined Quark Gluon Plasma. Moreover, he and Reddy also argued that Quarkyonic Matter may have the properties needed to explain determinations of neutron star equations of state.

== Awards and honors ==
- 1998 – Alexander von Humboldt Prize Winner, The Alexander Von Humboldt Foundation
- 2007 – Science and Technology Award, Brookhaven National Laboratory
- 2009 – Hans Jensen Award of the Institute for Theoretical Physics of the University of Heidelberg
- 2011 – Doctorate Honoris Causa, China Central Normal University, Wuhan, China
- 2015 – Herman Feshbach Prize, American Physical Society
- 2015 – Doctorate Honoris Causa. Jagiellonian University, Krakow, Poland
- 2021 – Pomeranchuk Prize, Institute for Theoretical and Experimental Physics

== Selected articles ==
- McLerran, L., & Venugopalan, R. (1994). Computing quark and gluon distribution functions for very large nuclei. Physical Review D, 49(5), 2233.
- McLerran, L., & Venugopalan, R. (1994). Gluon distribution functions for very large nuclei at small transverse momentum. Physical Review D, 49(7), 3352.
- McLerran, L., & Venugopalan, R. (1994). Green's function in the color field of a large nucleus. Physical Review D, 50(3), 2225.
- Jalilian-Marian, J., Kovner, A., McLerran, L., & Weigert, H. (1997). Intrinsic glue distribution at very small x. Physical Review D, 55(9), 5414.
- Iancu, E., Leonidov, A., & McLerran, L. (2001). Nonlinear gluon evolution in the color glass condensate: I. Nuclear Physics A, 692(3–4), 583–645.
- Ferreiro, E., Iancu, E., Leonidov, A., & McLerran, L. (2002). Nonlinear gluon evolution in the color glass condensate: II. Nuclear Physics A, 703(1–2), 489–538.
- Gyulassy, M., & McLerran, L. (2005). New forms of QCD matter discovered at RHIC. Nuclear Physics A, 750(1), 30–63.
- Csernai, L. P., Kapusta, J. I., & McLerran, L. D. (2006). Strongly interacting low-viscosity matter created in relativistic nuclear collisions. Physical review letters, 97(15), 152303.
- McLerran L., Pisarski R., (2007), Phases of Cold Dense Matter at Large Nc. Nuclear Physics A796 83–100
- Kharzeev, D. E., McLerran, L. D., & Warringa, H. J. (2008). The effects of topological charge change in heavy ion collisions:"Event by event P and CP violation". Nuclear Physics A, 803(3–4), 227–253.
