= Semyon Gershtein =

Soviet and Russian physicist (1929–2023)

- Семён Герштейн
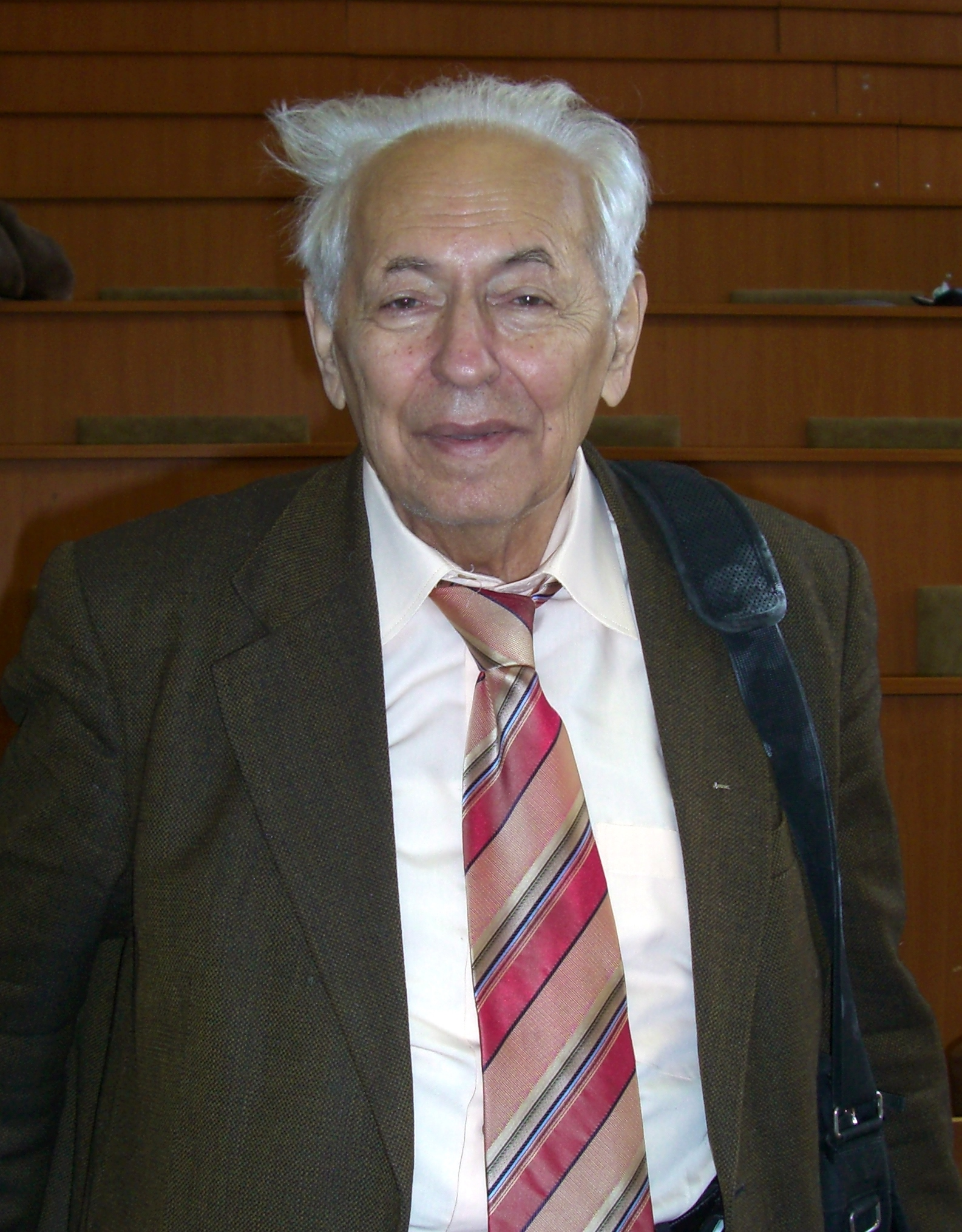
- Gerstein in 2011
- Born: 13 July 1929; Harbin, China
- Died: 20 February 2023 (aged 93); Moscow, Russia
- Education: MSU Faculty of Physics
- Awards: Order "For Merit to the Fatherland"; Order of Honour (Russia); USSR State Prize
- Scientific career
- Fields: Theoretical physics
- Workplaces: Institute for High Energy Physics; Moscow Institute of Physics and Technology
- Academic advisors: Anatoly Vlasov, Alexei Alexeyevich Abrikosov

Semyon Solomonovich Gershtein (13 July 1929 – 20 February 2023) was a Soviet and Russian physicist. He was an academician of Russian Academy of Sciences since 2003. He was a USSR State Prize laureate.

== Biography ==
Gershtein was born in Harbin, China. After graduating from the Department of Nuclear Physics (Faculty of Physics) in Moscow State University, he worked at a school in Kaluga Oblast until 1954. In 1955, he entered the graduate school of the Institute for Physical Problems.

Gershtein was a senior researcher in the Institute for High Energy Physics. He went on to become a professor of the Moscow Institute of Physics and Technology, Doctor of Physical and Mathematical Sciences (1963).

Gershtein authored more than two hundred publications and several scientific discoveries.

Gershtein died in Moscow on 20 February 2023, at the age of 93.

== Honors and awards ==
- Order "For Merit to the Fatherland" IV class (2005) — for his great contribution to the development of nuclear energy, a productive scientific activities and many years of conscientious work
- Order of Honour (Russia) (25 September 1999) — for services to the state, many years of hard work and great contribution to strengthening friendship and cooperation among peoples
- USSR State Prize
- Pomeranchuk Prize from Institute for Theoretical and Experimental Physics (2011)
- Landau Gold Medal (2013)

== Selected publications ==
- Gershtein, S. S.; Kiselev, V. V.; Likhoded, A. K.; Tkabladze, A. V. (1995). "B_{c} spectroscopy". Physical Review D. 51 (7): 3613–3627. arXiv:hep-ph/9406339. Bibcode:1995PhRvD..51.3613G. doi:10.1103/PhysRevD.51.3613. PMID 10018833.
- Gershtein, Semen S.; Kiselev, Valerii V.; Likhoded, Anatolii K.; Tkabladze, A. V. (1995). "Physics of B_{c}-mesons". Physics-Uspekhi. 38: 1–37. arXiv:hep-ph/9504319. doi:10.1070/PU1995v038n01ABEH000063. S2CID 119344200.
- Gershtein, S. S.; Kiselev, V. V.; Likhoded, A. K.; Onishchenko, A. I. (2000). "Spectroscopy of doubly heavy baryons". Physics of Atomic Nuclei. 63 (2): 274–286. arXiv:hep-ph/9811212. Bibcode:2000PAN....63..274G. doi:10.1134/1.855633. S2CID 53143533.
