= C-theorem =

Theorem in quantum field theory

In quantum field theory, the C-theorem states that there exists a positive real function, $C(g^{}_i,\mu)$, depending on the coupling constants of the quantum field theory considered, $g^{}_i$, and on the energy scale, $\mu^{}_{}$, which has the following properties:

- $C(g^{}_i,\mu)$ decreases monotonically under the renormalization group (RG) flow.
- At fixed points of the RG flow, which are specified by a set of fixed-point couplings $g^*_i$, the function $C(g^*_i,\mu)=C_*$ is a constant, independent of energy scale.

The theorem formalizes the notion that theories at high energies have more degrees of freedom than theories at low energies and that information is lost as we flow from the former to the latter.

== Two-dimensional case ==
Alexander Zamolodchikov proved in 1986 that two-dimensional quantum field theory always has such a C-function. Moreover, at fixed points of the RG flow, which correspond to conformal field theories, Zamolodchikov's C-function is equal to the central charge of the corresponding conformal field theory, which lends the name C to the theorem.

== Four-dimensional case: A-theorem ==
John Cardy in 1988 considered the possibility to generalise C-theorem to higher-dimensional quantum field theory. He conjectured that in four spacetime dimensions, the quantity behaving monotonically under renormalization group flows, and thus playing the role analogous to the central charge c in two dimensions, is a certain anomaly coefficient which came to be denoted as a. For this reason, the analog of the C-theorem in four dimensions is called the A-theorem.

In perturbation theory, that is for renormalization flows which do not deviate much from free theories, the A-theorem in four dimensions was proved by Hugh Osborn using the local renormalization group equation. However, the problem of finding a proof valid beyond perturbation theory remained open for many years.

In 2011, Zohar Komargodski and Adam Schwimmer of the Weizmann Institute of Science proposed a nonperturbative proof for the A-theorem, which has gained acceptance. (Still, simultaneous monotonic and cyclic (limit cycle) or even chaotic RG flows are compatible with such flow functions when multivalued in the couplings, as evinced in specific systems.) RG flows of theories in 4 dimensions and the question of whether scale invariance implies conformal invariance, is a field of active research and not all questions are settled.

== See also ==
- Conformal field theory
