= Cardy formula =

Formula in 2D conformal field theory

In physics, the Cardy formula gives the entropy of a two-dimensional conformal field theory (CFT). In recent years, this formula has been especially useful in the calculation of the entropy of BTZ black holes and in checking the AdS/CFT correspondence and the holographic principle.

Using results by J. L. Cardy, the following entropy formula can be derived:

$$S=2\pi\sqrt{\tfrac{c}{6}\bigl(L_0-\tfrac{c}{24}\bigr)}.$$

Here $c$ is the central charge, $L_0 = ER$ is the product of the total energy and radius of the system, and the shift of $c/24$ is related to the Casimir effect. These data emerge from the Virasoro algebra of this CFT. The proof of the above formula relies on modular invariance of a Euclidean CFT on the torus.

The Cardy formula is usually understood as counting the number of states of energy $\Delta = L_0 + \bar{L}_0$ of a CFT quantized on a circle. To be precise, the microcanonical entropy (that is to say, the logarithm of the number of states in a shell of width $\delta \lesssim 1$) is given by

$$S_\delta(\Delta) = 2\pi \sqrt{\frac{c\Delta}{3}} + O(\ln \Delta)$$

in the limit $\Delta \to \infty$. This formula can be turned into a rigorous bound.

In 2000, E. Verlinde extended this to certain strongly-coupled (n+1)-dimensional CFTs. The resulting Cardy–Verlinde formula was obtained by studying a radiation-dominated universe with the Friedmann–Lemaître–Robertson–Walker metric

$$ds^2=-dt^2+R^2(t)\Omega^2_n$$

where R is the radius of a n-dimensional sphere at time t. The radiation is represented by a (n+1)-dimensional CFT. The entropy of that CFT is then given by the formula

$$S=\frac{2\pi R}{n}\sqrt{E_c(2E-E_c)},$$

where E_{c} is the Casimir effect, and E the total energy. The above reduced formula gives the maximal entropy

$$S\le S_{max}=\frac{2\pi RE}{n},$$

when E_{c}=E, which is the Bekenstein bound. The Cardy–Verlinde formula was later shown by Kutasov and Larsen to be invalid for weakly interacting CFTs. In fact, since the entropy of higher dimensional (meaning n>1) CFTs is dependent on exactly marginal couplings, it is believed that a Cardy formula for the entropy is not achievable when n>1.

== See also ==
- BTZ black hole
- AdS/CFT correspondence
- Holographic principle
- Conformal field theory
