= Alexander Dolgov =

Alexander Dolgov may refer to:

- Aleksandr Dolgov, Russian footballer
- Alexander Dolgov (physicist)
