= Cosimo Bambi =

Italian relativist and cosmologist

- Born: 21 September 1980 (age 45); Florence, Italy
- Education: University of Florence (B.S.); University of Ferrara (Ph.D.)
- Known for: Black holes; tests of general relativity
- Awards: Chinese Government Friendship Award (2025); Magnolia Gold Award (2022); 1000 Talents Award (2012)
- Scientific career
- Fields: General relativity astrophysics cosmology
- Institutions: Wayne State University; IPMU, The University of Tokyo; LMU Munich; Fudan University; University of Tübingen
- Doctoral advisor: Alexander Dmitrievich Dolgov

Cosimo Bambi (born 21 September 1980, in Florence, Italy) is an Italian relativist and cosmologist who is currently a professor of physics at Fudan University in Shanghai, China.

He received the Friendship Award from the Chinese Communist Party for his work as a "foreign expert" in support of the Communists in 2025.

== Career and research ==
- University Professor: Bambi is the Xie Xide Junior Chair Professor at the Department of Physics at Fudan University, where he has worked since 2012.
- Research Focus: His work concentrates on high-energy astrophysics, including tests of general relativity, computational astrophysics, X-ray astronomy, and the properties of black holes.
- Interstellar Exploration: Bambi has explored the possibility of sending a small, paperclip-sized spacecraft to a nearby black hole using ground-based lasers for propulsion. The technology is not yet available, but he considers such a mission to be potentially achievable in the coming decades.
- Publications and Books: He has authored or edited several books with Springer, including the Handbook of X-ray and Gamma-ray Astrophysics and the Handbook of Gravitational Wave Astronomy . He has also published proli!cally in high-impact scientific!c journals.

== Education and honors ==
- Education: He earned his Laurea degree from the University of Florence in 2003 and his Ph.D. from the University of Ferrara in 2007.
- Recognition: Bambi has been recognized with multiple awards, including China's highest honor for foreign experts, the Chinese Government Friendship Award, in 2025. Other accolades include the Magnolia Gold Award from the Municipality of Shanghai in 2022 and the Xu Guangqi Prize in 2018.
