= Boundary conformal field theory =

Conformal field theory on a spacetime with a boundary

In theoretical physics, boundary conformal field theory (BCFT) is a conformal field theory defined on a spacetime with a boundary (or boundaries). Different kinds of boundary conditions for the fields may be imposed on the fundamental fields; for example, Neumann boundary condition or Dirichlet boundary condition is acceptable for free bosonic fields. BCFT was developed by John Cardy.

In the context of string theory, physicists are often interested in two-dimensional BCFTs. The specific types of boundary conditions in a specific CFT describe different kinds of D-branes.

BCFT is also used in condensed matter physics - it can be used to study boundary critical behavior and to solve quantum impurity models.

== See also ==
- Conformal field theory
- Operator product expansion
- Critical point
