= Alexander Dolgov (physicist) =

- Born: Alexander Dmitriyevich Dolgov; July 1, 1941 (age 83); Russia
- Education: Moscow Institute of Physics and Technology; Institute for Theoretical and Experimental Physics (PhD)
- Scientific career
- Fields: Astroparticle physics Cosmology
- Institutions: ITEP; Theoretical Astrophysics Center of University of Copenhagen; Dirigente di ricerca INFN, Sezione di Ferrara; University of Ferrara; Novosibirsk State University
- Doctoral advisor: Lev Okun
- Doctoral students: Cosimo Bambi

Alexander Dmitriyevich Dolgov (born 1 July 1941) is a Russian physicist and a professor at Novosibirsk State University and the University of Ferrara who is known for his contribution in cosmology and astroparticle physics.

== Public position ==
In February 2022, he signed an open letter by Russian scientists condemning the 2022 Russian invasion of Ukraine.

== Awards ==
- Lenin Komsomol Prize, 1973.
- Landau-Weizmann in Theoretical Physics (Weizmann Institute of Science), 1996
- Bruno Pontecorvo Prize (JINR, Dubna, Russia), 2009
- Friedmann Prize (Russian Academy of Sciences), 2011
- Markov Prize in 2014
- Member of the International Society on General Relativity and Gravitation.
- Member of the Assembly of Experts INTAS (until 2008).

== Books ==
- Basics of modern cosmology
- Introduction to Particle Cosmology: The Standard Model of Cosmology and its Open Problems
