= Penguin diagram =

Class of Feynman diagrams

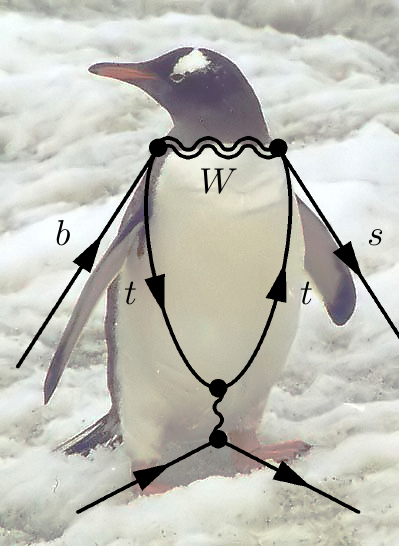
Example of a penguin diagram superimposed on an image of a Gentoo penguin.

In quantum field theory, penguin diagrams are a class of Feynman diagrams which are important for understanding CP violating processes in the Standard Model. They refer to one-loop processes in which a quark temporarily changes flavor (via a W or Z loop), and the flavor-changed quark engages in some tree interaction, typically a strong one. For the interactions where some quark flavors (e.g., very heavy ones) have much higher interaction amplitudes than others, such as CP-violating or Higgs interactions, these penguin processes may have amplitudes comparable to or even greater than those of the direct tree processes. A similar diagram can be drawn for leptonic decays.

They were first isolated and studied by Mikhail Shifman, Arkady Vainshtein, and Valentin Zakharov.

The processes which they describe were first directly observed in 1991 and 1994 by the CLEO collaboration.

== Origin of the name ==
John Ellis was the first to refer to a certain class of Feynman diagrams as "penguin diagrams" in a 1977 paper on b-quarks. The name came about in part due to their shape, and in part due to a legendary bar-room bet with Melissa Franklin. According to John Ellis:

"Mary K. [Gaillard], Dimitri [Nanopoulos] and I first got interested in what are now called penguin diagrams while we were studying CP violation in the Standard Model in 1976... The penguin name came in 1977, as follows.

In the spring of 1977, Mike Chanowitz, Mary K and I wrote a paper on GUTs predicting the b quark mass before it was found. When it was found a few weeks later, Mary K, Dimitri, Serge Rudaz and I immediately started working on its phenomenology. That summer, there was a student at CERN, Melissa Franklin who is now an experimentalist at Harvard. One evening, she, I, and Serge went to a pub, and she and I started a game of darts. We made a bet that if I lost I had to put the word penguin into my next paper. She actually left the darts game before the end, and was replaced by Serge, who beat me. Nevertheless, I felt obligated to carry out the conditions of the bet.

For some time, it was not clear to me how to get the word into this b quark paper that we were writing at the time. Then, one evening, after working at CERN, I stopped on my way back to my apartment to visit some friends living in Meyrin where I smoked some illegal substance. Later, when I got back to my apartment and continued working on our paper, I had a sudden flash that the famous diagrams look like penguins. So we put the name into our paper, and the rest, as they say, is history."
