= Lev Okun =

Russian physicist

- Лев Окунь
- Born: 7 July 1929; Sukhinichi, Soviet Union
- Died: 23 November 2015 (aged 86); Moscow, Russia
- Education: Moscow Mechanical Institute
- Known for: Coining "hadron" ITEP sum rules Mirror matter Okun–Pomeranchuk theorem Sakata-Okun model Eta meson
- Awards: Bruno Pontecorvo Prize (1996); Matteucci Medal (1988); Landau Gold Medal (2002); Pomeranchuk Prize (2008)
- Scientific career
- Workplaces: Moscow Institute of Physics and Technology

Lev Borisovich Okun (Russian: Лев Борисович Окунь; 7 July 1929 – 23 November 2015) was a Soviet theoretical physicist. He is known for his contributions to particle physics and quantum chromodynamics. He coined the term hadron.

== Biography ==
Lev Okun was born in a Jewish family in Sukhinichi in 1929 in the Soviet Union, and graduated from Moscow Mechanical Institute in 1953 where he was a student of Arkady Migdal and later a graduate student of Isaak Pomeranchuk.

He had worked since 1954 at the Institute for Theoretical and Experimental Physics in Moscow, whose Theoretical Physics Laboratory he headed for 30 years; was professor at the Moscow Institute of Physics and Technology.

== Research and publications ==
Okun introduced the term "hadron" in a plenary talk at the 1962 International Conference on High Energy Physics: In this talk he said:

Notwithstanding the fact that this report deals with weak interactions, we shall frequently have to speak of strongly interacting particles. These particles pose not only numerous scientific problems, but also a terminological problem. The point is that "strongly interacting particles" is a very clumsy term which does not yield itself to the formation of an adjective. For this reason, to take but one instance, decays into strongly interacting particles are called non-leptonic. This definition is not exact because "non-leptonic" may also signify "photonic". In this report I shall call strongly interacting particles "hadrons", and the corresponding decays "hadronic" (the Greek ἁδρός signifies "large", "massive", in contrast to λεπτός which means "small", "light"). I hope that this terminology will prove to be convenient.

One of Okun's favorite subjects was the study of weak interactions. From his early works, he contributed several fundamental results to its development, such as the conclusion that violation of P-parity in β-decay also means the violation of C-parity (1957, together with Boris L. Ioffe and A. P. Rudik), as well as an evaluation of the difference between the masses of neutral K-mesons (with Bruno Pontecorvo, 1957).

His book Weak Interaction of Elementary Particles, published in 1963, became a textbook and a desktop reference material for several generations of students and academics. This book, that appeared before the quark model was based on one of the first successful composite models of hadrons, the Sakata-Okun model, that he was developing since 1958. In this model, all known particles were constructed of three Sakaton proto-particles predecessors of quarks. He had predicted the existence of η and η′ mesons, and formulated the selection rule ∆Q = ∆S for semi-leptonic decays of strange particles.

In the field of strong interactions the famous Okun-Pomeranchuk theorem on the equality of cross sections for scattering of the particles from the same isomultiplet at asymptotically high energies was proved in 1956. In the 70s, he and co-authors developed a new method of quantum chromodynamics sum rules, that became known in the literature as the "ITEP Sum Rules".

He has made seminal contributions to the new field of research at the intersection of particle physics, cosmology and astrophysics. A method for calculating relic abundance of elementary particles during the expansion of the Universe was developed in his 1965 paper with Yakov Zel'dovich and S. B. Pikel'ner. They performed a calculation of the abundance of free quarks. Non-observation of free quarks was one of the arguments for quark confinement. Now the approach that emerged from this paper became a standard tool in the studies of the origin of dark matter in the Universe.

In 1964, in the paper written together with Pomeranchuk and Kobzarev, the idea of "mirror world" came into existence. "Mirror matter" is still a possible candidate for dark matter.

Vacuum domain walls investigated by him in 1974 were the first macroscopic object of quantum field theory that could determine the evolution of the Universe. In the same year, Okun together with Mikhail B. Voloshin and I. Y. Kobzarev published a pioneering paper on the decay of the false vacuum—a subject that unexpectedly became of a relevance to the physical vacuum in our Universe after the discovery of the Higgs boson with mass 125 GeV.

== Organisational affiliations ==
He has served as a member of the Scientific Policy Committees of CERN, SSC and DESY. He was a member of the Russian Academy of Sciences and the Academia Europaea, an honorary member of the New York Academy of Sciences, and a Fellow of the Institute of Physics.

== Awards and honors ==
- Bruno Pontecorvo Prize (1996)
- Matteucci Medal (1988)
- Landau Gold Medal (2002)
- Pomeranchuk Prize (2008)

== Books ==
- Okun', L. B. (2013-10-22). Weak Interaction of Elementary Particles: International Series of Monographs in Natural Philosophy. Elsevier. ISBN 978-1-4831-3949-4.
