= Serge Rudaz =

Serge Rudaz (born August 19, 1954, pronounced "Rü-DAH") is a Canadian theoretical physicist and professor of physics at the University of Minnesota. He previously served as the director of undergraduate studies of the University of Minnesota's physics department, and is now the director of undergraduate honors at the University of Minnesota. Rudaz received his Ph.D. in 1979 from Cornell University and his undergraduate degree from McGill University.

== Teaching ==
In the spring of 2007, Rudaz was named as the director of the University of Minnesota's new campus-wide honors program, which began operation during the fall of 2008.

== Research ==
In 1995, he was elected Fellow of the American Physical Society "for original and influential contributions to the phenomenology of heavy quarks, supersymmetry and grand unification, and particle astrophysics." In 1985, Rudaz was the recipient of the Canadian Association of Physicists Herzberg Medal. He is the only physicist in the Herzberg Medal's history from a non-Canadian institution.

Rudaz's research interests include:

- unified theories of elementary particle interactions and their phenomenology, applications to cosmology and the particle/astrophysics interface
- relativistic many-body physics, including phase transitions in field theories at finite temperature and density; models of hadronic interactions
- physics of topological defect formation in the early universe and in condensed systems

== See also ==
- Penguin diagrams
