= Polyakov formula =

In differential geometry and mathematical physics (especially string theory), the Polyakov formula expresses the conformal variation of the zeta functional determinant of a Riemannian manifold. Proposed by Alexander Markovich Polyakov, this formula arose in the study of the quantum theory of strings. The corresponding density is local, and therefore is a Riemannian curvature invariant. In particular, whereas the functional determinant itself is prohibitively difficult to work with in general, its conformal variation can be written down explicitly.
