= Karen Ter-Martirosian =

Russian theoretical physicist (1922–2005)

- Карен Тер-Мартиросян; Կարեն Տեր-Մարտիրոսյան
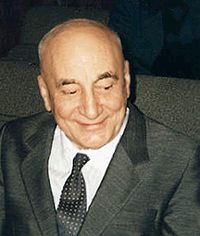
- Born: September 28, 1922; Tbilisi, Soviet Union
- Died: November 19, 2005 (aged 83); Moscow, Russia
- Known for: Theoretical physicist and founder of Elementary Particle Physics chair of the MIPT
- Awards: Pomeranchuk Prize (1999)
- Scientific career
- Fields: Theoretical high energy physics
- Workplaces: Institute for Theoretical and Experimental Physics (ITEP); Moscow Institute of Physics and Technology (MIPT)
- Notable students: Alexander Polyakov

Karen Avetovich Ter-Martirosyan (Russian: Карен Аветикович Тер-Мартиросян; 28 September 1922 – 19 November 2005) was a Soviet and Russian theoretical physicist of Armenian descent. He is known for his contributions to quantum mechanics and quantum field theory and the author of several hundred articles in his area.

He was born in Tbilisi (Georgian SSR) and graduated from Tbilisi State University in 1943. After two years of teaching physics at the Tbilisi Railroad Institute, he obtained a Candidate of Sciences degree (Ph.D. equivalent) at the Leningrad Physico-Technical Institute in St. Petersburg, advised by Yakov Frenkel. After working at the theory division the same place (1949–55) he moved to Institute for Theoretical and Experimental Physics (ITEP) in Moscow, where he founded the Elementary Particle Physics chair of the Moscow Institute of Physics and Technology and the Laboratory of Hadron Physics at ITEP.

He was a student of Lev Landau and his research colleague Isaak Pomeranchuk. Among his students were Vladimir Gribov, Alexey Andreevich Anselm, Alexander Polyakov, Arkady Migdal, Alexander Zamolodchikov, Alexey Kaidalov. Also, he organized schools and conferences in Nor-Hamberd of Yerevan in Armenia.

== Awards ==
- Pomeranchuk Prize 1999
- member of Russian Academy of Science 2000

== Publications ==
- Theory of Gauge Interactions of Elementary Particles (1984). Book, with Misha Voloshin
- Theory of Coulomb excitation of nuclei (1952)
- Theory of three body systems (1956)
- Development of the Regge pole theory for high energy scattering and theory of Regge cuts, with V.N.Gribov and I.Ya.Pomeranchuk, 1964–1976
- QCD inspired model of quark-gluon strings, with A.B.Kaidalov
