= Evgenii Feinberg =

Soviet theoretical physicist (1912–2005)

Evgenii L'vovich Feinberg (27 June 1912 – 10 December 2005) was a Soviet physicist, recognized for his contributions to theoretical physics.

He was the son of a physician, born in Baku, moving to Moscow in 1918 where he graduated from Moscow State University as a theoretical physicist in 1935. He did research at the Lebedev Physical Institute in Troitsk, Moscow Oblast from 1938, where he published over a hundred works in his field. Feinberg studied radio physics (wave propagation), statistical acoustics, the neutron, cosmic rays and particle physics. In his early years, he studied the beta-decay of ionized atoms (1939), inelastic coherent processes (1941) and inelastic diffraction processes (1954).

Feinberg headed the high-energy particle interaction research groups 1952–78. He was a guest professor at Nizhny Novgorod State University 1944–46 and a professor at his former school, Moscow Engineering Physics Institute 1946–54, which later became the Moscow Institute of Physics and Technology.

== Awards ==
- Member of Russian Academy of Science
- Pomeranchuk Prize 2000 for his studies of inelasticity of colliding hadron

== Publications ==
- On the propagation of radio waves along an imperfect surface, J. Phys., vol. 9, pp. 317–330, 1944
- About the external diffractive production of particles in nuclear collisions (1953), with Isaak Pomeranchuk
- Propagation of radiowaves along the terrestrial surface (1961)
- Direct production of photons and dileptons in multiple hadron production (1976)
- Hadron clusters and half-dressed particles in quantum field theory (1980)
- Art in a science dominated world (Gordon & Breach, 1987)
- Physicists. Epoch and Personalities (World Scientific, 2011)
