= Conformal bootstrap =

Mathematical method to constrain and solve conformal field theories

The conformal bootstrap is a non-perturbative mathematical method to constrain and solve conformal field theories, i.e. models of particle physics or statistical physics that exhibit similar properties at different levels of resolution.

== Overview ==
Unlike more traditional techniques of quantum field theory, conformal bootstrap does not use the Lagrangian of the theory. Instead, it operates with the general axiomatic parameters, such as the scaling dimensions of the local operators and their operator product expansion coefficients. A key axiom is that the product of local operators must be expressible as a sum over local operators (thus turning the product into an algebra); the sum must have a non-zero radius of convergence. This leads to decompositions of correlation functions into structure constants and conformal blocks.

The main ideas of the conformal bootstrap were formulated in the 1970s by the Soviet physicist Alexander Polyakov and the Italian physicists Sergio Ferrara, Raoul Gatto and Aurelio Grillo. Other early pioneers of this idea were Gerhard Mack and Ivan Todorov.

In two dimensions, the conformal bootstrap was demonstrated to work in 1983 by Alexander Belavin, Alexander Polyakov and Alexander Zamolodchikov. Many two-dimensional conformal field theories were solved using this method, notably the minimal models and the Liouville field theory.

In higher dimensions, the conformal bootstrap started to develop following the 2008 paper by Riccardo Rattazzi, Slava Rychkov, Erik Tonni and Alessandro Vichi. The method was since used to obtain many general results about conformal and superconformal field theories in three, four, five and six dimensions. Applied to the conformal field theory describing the critical point of the three-dimensional Ising model, it produced the most precise predictions for its critical exponents.

== Current research ==
The international Simons Collaboration on the Nonperturbative Bootstrap unites researchers devoted to developing and applying the conformal bootstrap and other related techniques in quantum field theory.

== History of the name ==
The modern usage of the term "conformal bootstrap" was introduced in 1984 by Belavin et al. In the earlier literature, the name was sometimes used to denote a different approach to conformal field theories, nowadays referred to as the skeleton expansion or the "old bootstrap". This older method is perturbative in nature, and is not directly related to the conformal bootstrap in the modern sense of the term.
