= Boris Sharkov =

Russian Physicist

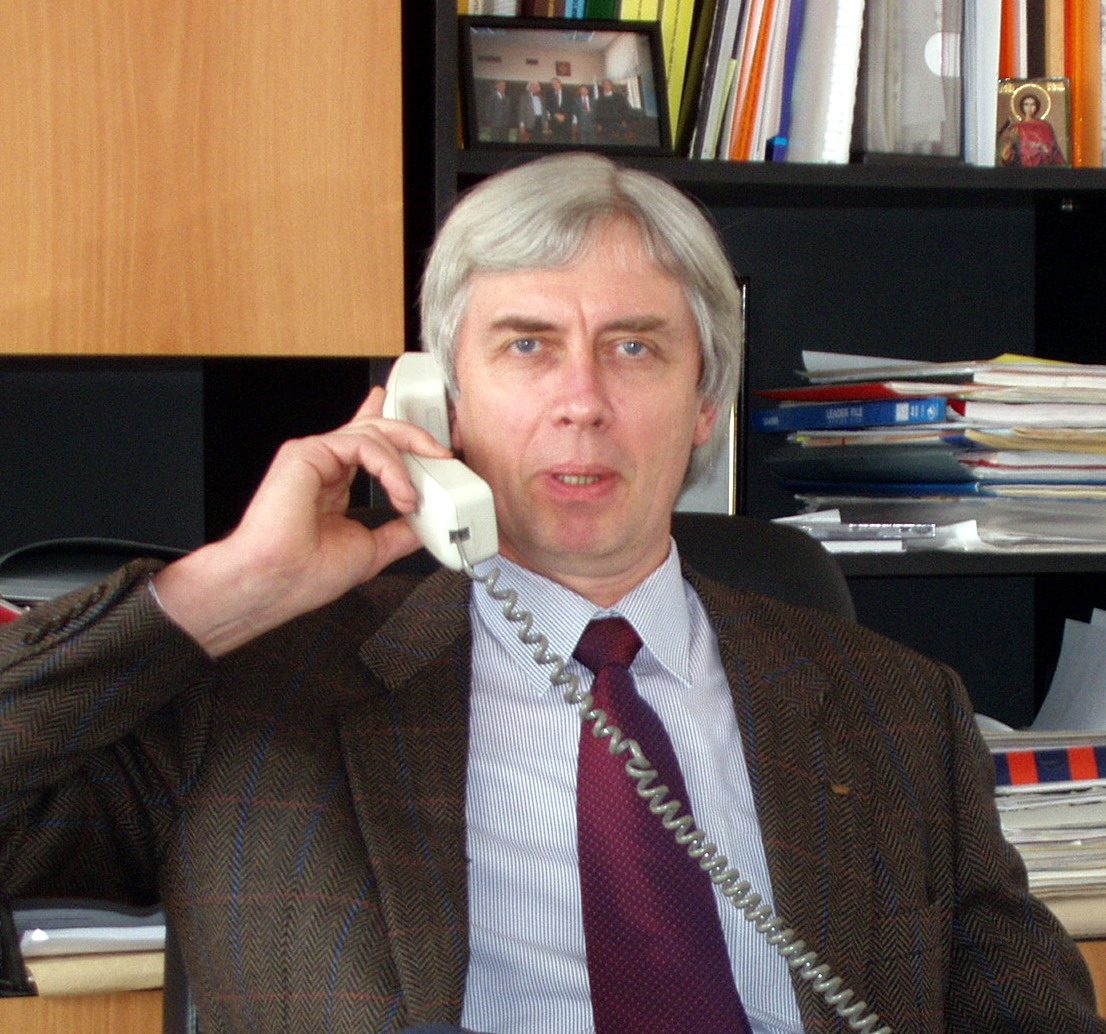
Mr. Sharkov is speaking on the phone.

Boris Yuriyevich Sharkov (Russian: Бори́с Ю́рьевич Шарко́в, German: Boris Scharkow; born 11 February 1950 in Moscow) is a Russian physicist.

== Biography ==
Boris Sharkov studied physics from 1967 to 1973 at Moscow Engineering Physics Institute (MEPhI) at the Faculty of Theoretical and Experimental Physics. In 1979 he received his doctorate in plasma physics. He organized a group for heavy-ion research in laser-produced plasma at ITEP, which deals with the development of source of highly charged ions for the ITEP accelerator. In 1991 he earned his second doctorate (Habilitation) in "Physics of the ion beam of charged particle beams and accelerator physics." In 1999 he was awarded the title of Professor by the Supreme certifying commission of Russia and since 2005 he holds a chair at National Research Nuclear University MEPhI. Since 1996 Boris Sharkov is a co-author and the head of the project of reconstruction of the ITEP accelerator: ITEP proton accelerator was upgraded into a heavy ion accelerator. In 1997 he was Vice Director and from 2005 to 2008 Director of the State Research Center ITEP in Moscow.

Since 2009 he is a Chairman and a Scientific Managing Director of “Facility for Antiproton and Ion Research in Europe”.

Boris Sharkov is a specialist in the field of physics of matter under extreme conditions, as well as in the field of accelerator physics. The main scientific results of Boris Sharkov are devoted to the problems of heavy ion fusion and the related studies of extreme states of matter under the impact of concentrated energy fluxes of heavy ions on the dense ionized matter. He is author and co-author of more than 200 publications, including four books and has three patents.

Boris Sharkov is a member of the Nuclear Society of Russia, member of the editorial boards of three scientific journals, member of the Scientific Councils of the State Corporation "Rosatom" and Russian Academy of Sciences. From 2006 to 2012, he was a member of the board of Plasma Physics of European Physical Society. In 2006 he was elected to a Corresponding Member of the Russian Academy of Sciences. Boris Sharkov has won numerous awards: he is laureate of the "State Prize of the Government of Russian Federation in the field of science and technology" and the winner of the Veksler price of Russian Academy of Sciences. In 2016 he was elected to be full member of Russian Academy of Sciences. From January 2017 he has a position of vice-director of Joint Institute for Nuclear Research in Dubna, Russian Federation. In this position he is representing JINR in numerous European research organizations (NuPECC, ESG PP, APECC, ...).
