= Alexander Zamolodchikov =

Russian physicist

Alexander B. Zamolodchikov
- Born: September 18, 1952 (age 73); Novo-Ivankovo, USSR
- Education: Institute for Theoretical and Experimental Physics; Moscow Institute of Physics and Technology
- Known for: 2D Conformal Field theory Zamolodchikov C-theorem; Knizhnik–Zamolodchikov equations W algebra Conformal bootstrap Liouville field theory Parafermion; TTbar deformation
- Awards: Dannie Heineman Prize for Mathematical Physics; Humboldt Prize; Blaise Pascal Chair; Lars Onsager Prize; Dirac Medal; Member of the National Academy of Sciences; Breakthrough Prize in Fundamental Physics
- Scientific career
- Fields: Theoretical Physics; Statistical Mechanics; High Energy Physics; Conformal Field Theory; Statistical field theory Condensed Matter Physics; Integrable Systems
- Doctoral advisor: Karen Ter-Martirosian

Alexander Borisovich Zamolodchikov (Russian: Алекса́ндр Бори́сович Замоло́дчиков; born September 18, 1952) is a Russian-American theoretical physicist, known for his contributions to conformal field theory, statistical mechanics, string theory and condensed matter physics.

He is widely regarded as one of the most accomplished theoretical physicists for his profound contributions to fundamental physics and especially to Quantum Field Theories, for which he was awarded the Breakthrough Prize in Fundamental Physics in 2024. He is currently the C.N. Yang – Wei Deng Endowed Chair of Physics at Stony Brook University.

== Biography ==
Born in Novo-Ivankovo, now part of Dubna, Zamolodchikov earned a M.Sc. in nuclear engineering (1975) from Moscow Institute of Physics and Technology, a Ph.D. in physics from the Institute for Theoretical and Experimental Physics (1978). He joined the research staff of Landau Institute for Theoretical Physics (1978) where he got a Doctor of Sciences degree (1983).

He co-authored the famous BPZ paper "Infinite Conformal Symmetry in Two-Dimensional Quantum Field Theory", with Alexander Polyakov and Alexander Belavin.

He joined Rutgers University (1990) where he co-founded Rutgers New High Energy Theory Center, and was named Board of Governors Professor (2005).

In 2016, he became the inaugural holder of the C. N. Yang/Wei Deng Chair in the Department of Physics and Astronomy and C. N. Yang Institute for Theoretical Physics at Stony Brook University.

He is the twin brother of the late Alexei Zamolodchikov (1952–2007), also a noted physicist.

== Awards ==
- 1999: Dannie Heineman Prize for Mathematical Physics with Barry M. McCoy and Tai Tsun Wu for "their groundbreaking and penetrating work on classical statistical mechanics, integrable models and conformal field theories."
- 2003/04: Humboldt Prize
- 2005: Blaise Pascal Chair at the École Normale Supérieure in Paris
- 2011: Lars Onsager Prize, together with Alexander Belavin and Alexander Polyakov, "for the remarkable ideas that they introduced concerning conformal field theory and soluble models of statistical mechanics in two dimensions."
- 2011: Dirac Medal from the International Center for Theoretical Physics, Trieste.
- 2016: elected to the National Academy of Sciences
- 2024: Breakthrough Prize in Fundamental Physics, "for profound contributions to statistical physics and quantum field theory, with diverse and far-reaching applications in different branches of physics and mathematics."

== See also ==
- C-theorem
- Conformal bootstrap
- Knizhnik–Zamolodchikov equations
- Thirring model
- W-algebra
