= Johanna Erdmenger =

German theoretical physicist

Johanna Karen Erdmenger
- Education: Hamburg University (Diplom); Cambridge University (Part III); Cambridge University (PhD)
- Scientific career
- Fields: Theoretical physics
- Workplaces: University of Würzburg
- Thesis: Implications of Conformal Invariance for Quantum Field Theories in General Dimensions
- Doctoral advisor: Hugh Osborn

Johanna Karen Erdmenger (born 1969) is a German theoretical physicist whose research interests include string theory, quantum field theory, quantum gravity, and gauge/gravity duality, with applications on all scales from particle physics and superfluids to black holes and cosmology. She is a professor at the University of Würzburg where she holds the chair in Theoretical Physics III.

== Education and career ==
After secondary school and a European Baccalaureate at the European School, Brussels II, Erdmenger studied physics at the University of Hamburg, receiving a diploma in 1992 under the supervision of Kurt Scharnberg. Next, she went to the University of Cambridge in England for Part III of the Mathematical Tripos, and remained at Cambridge for her doctoral studies, which she completed in 1996. Her doctoral dissertation, Implications of Conformal Invariance for Quantum Field Theories in General Dimensions, was supervised by Hugh Osborn.

After postdoctoral research at Leipzig University and the Massachusetts Institute of Technology, she became a research group leader at the Institute for Physics of the Humboldt University of Berlin from 2001 to 2005 with the support of the Emmy Noether Program; she completed a habilitation there in 2004. From 2005 to 2016 she was a researcher and research group leader at the Max Planck Institute for Physics in Munich, also adding in 2014 an honorary professorship at LMU Munich. She took her present position as professor and chairholder at the University of Würzburg in 2016.

== Books ==
Erdmenger is the author of the book String Cosmology: Modern String Theory Concepts from the Big Bang to Cosmic Structure (Wiley, 2009). She coauthored Gauge/Gravity Duality: Foundations and Applications (with Martin Ammon, Cambridge University Press, 2015.
