= Blaise Pascal Chair =

The Blaise Pascal Chairs (Chaires Internationales de Recherche Blaise Pascal), established in 1996 by the Government of the Île-de-France Region for internationally acclaimed foreign scientists in all disciplines. A scientific committee annually selects the most outstanding candidates from all over the world. Since their inception a number of famous scientists have been Blaise Pascal Chair laureates: Gérard Debreu (UC Berkeley, 1983 Nobel Prize in Economics), Ahmed Zewail (Caltech, 1999 Nobel Prize in Chemistry), Igor Mel'čuk (University of Montreal, the world leading researcher in linguistics), George Smoot (LBL, 2006 Nobel Prize in experimental Astrophysics), Robert Langlands (UBC, 1996 Wolf Prize, one of the most influential mathematicians of the 20th century), outstanding theoretical physicists Gabriele Veneziano (CERN/College de France), Alexander Zamolodchikov (Rutgers), and others.
