= Sakata model =

Superseded model in particle physics

In particle physics, the Sakata model of hadrons was a precursor to the quark model. It proposed that the proton, neutron, and Lambda baryon were elementary particles (sometimes referred to as sakatons), and that all other known hadrons were made of them. The model was proposed by Shoichi Sakata in 1956. The model was successful in explaining many features of hadrons, but was supplanted by the quark model as the understanding of hadrons progressed.

== Overview ==
The success of the Sakata model is due to the fact that there is a correspondence between the proton, neutron, and Lambda baryon, and the up, down, and strange quarks. The proton contains two up quarks and a down quark, the neutron contains one up quark and two down quarks, while the Lambda baryon contains one up quark, one down quark, and one strange quark. That is, each of these baryons is made of one up and one down quark, and an additional quark: up for the proton, down for the neutron, and strange for the Lambda baryon. Because of this correspondence to the up, down, and strange quarks, the Sakata model has the same SU(3) symmetry as the quark model, and can reproduce the flavour quantum numbers of all hadrons made of up, down and strange quarks. Because the charm quark was not discovered until 1974, the Sakata model remained a staple of particle physics for some time after the quark model had been proposed.

== See also ==
- Eightfold Way
