= Alexander Polyakov (physicist) =

Russian theoretical physicist

Alexander M. Polyakov
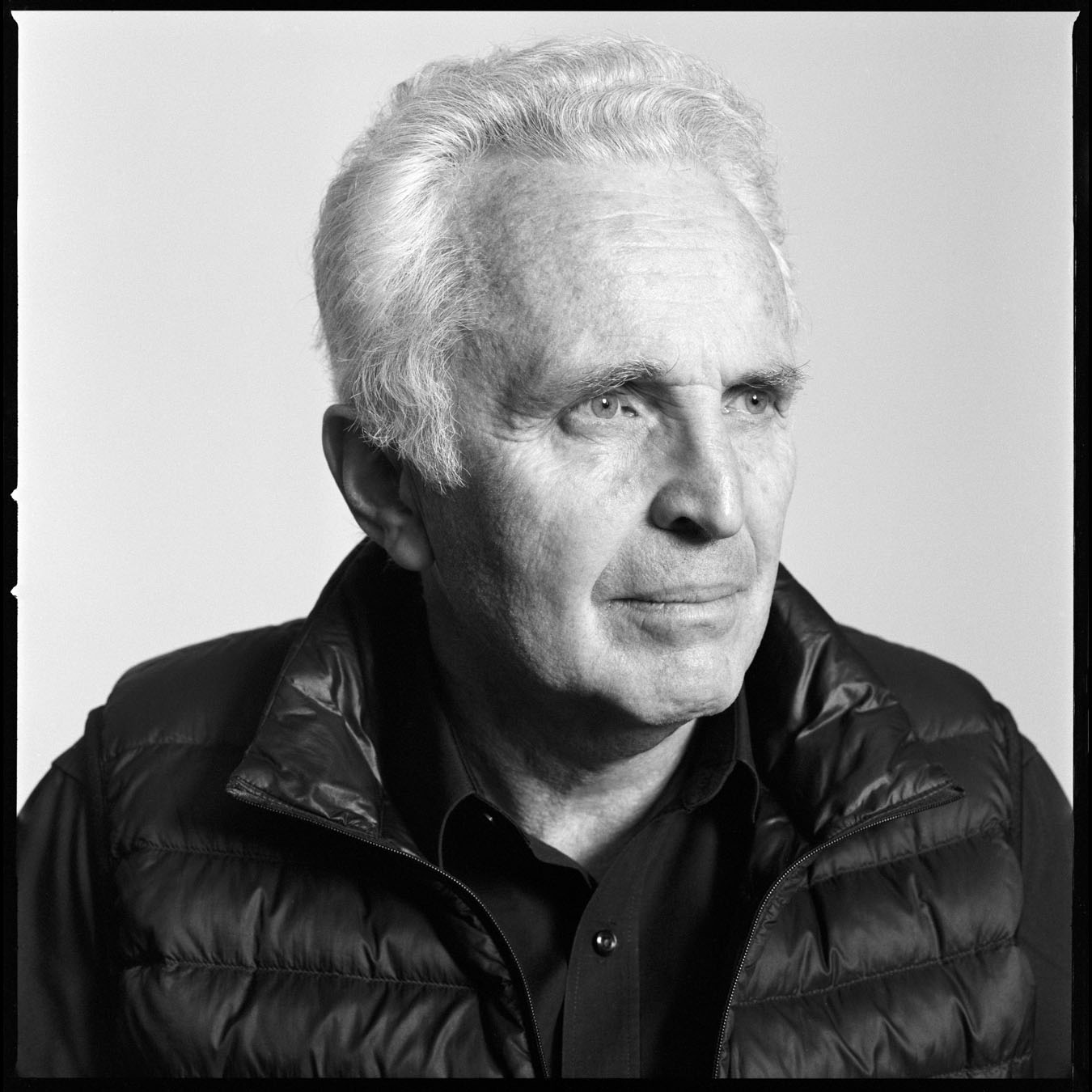
- Born: 27 September 1945 (age 81); Moscow, Russian SFSR, Soviet Union
- Education: Moscow Institute of Physics and Technology
- Known for: String theory 't Hooft–Polyakov monopole BPST instanton Polyakov action Conformal bootstrap Belavin–Polyakov–Zamolodchikov equations Liouville field theory AdS/CFT correspondence Polyakov loop Higgs mechanism Higher-spin theory Polyakov formula
- Awards: Max Planck Medal (2021); Breakthrough Prize in Fundamental Physics (2013); Lars Onsager Prize (2011); Harvey Prize (2010); Pomeranchuk Prize (2004); Oskar Klein Medal (1996); Lorentz Medal (1994); Dannie Heineman Prize (1986); Dirac Medal of the ICTP (1986)
- Scientific career
- Fields: Theoretical high energy physics
- Workplaces: Princeton University; Landau Institute for Theoretical Physics
- Doctoral advisor: Karen Ter-Martirosian

Alexander Markovich Polyakov (Russian: Алекса́ндр Ма́ркович Поляко́в; born 27 September 1945) is a Russian-American theoretical physicist, formerly at the Landau Institute in Moscow and since 1989, at Princeton University, where he is the Joseph Henry Professor of Physics Emeritus.

== Important discoveries ==
Polyakov is known for a number of fundamental contributions to quantum field theory, including work on what is now called the 't Hooft–Polyakov monopole in non-Abelian gauge theory, independent from Gerard 't Hooft. Polyakov and coauthors discovered the so-called BPST instanton which, in turn, led to the discovery of the vacuum angle in QCD. His path integral formulation of string theory had profound and lasting impacts on the conceptual and mathematical understanding of the theory. His paper "Infinite conformal symmetry in two-dimensional quantum field theory" written with Alexander Belavin and Alexander Zamolodchikov laid down the foundations of two-dimensional conformal field theory and has classic status. Polyakov also played an important role in elucidating the conceptual framework behind renormalization independent of Kenneth G. Wilson's Nobel Prize-winning work. He formulated pioneering ideas in gauge/string duality long before the breakthrough of AdS/CFT using D-branes. Other insightful conjectures that came years or even decades before active work by others include integrability of gauge and string theories and certain ideas about turbulence.

Very early in his career, in a 1965 student work, Polyakov suggested (with Alexander Migdal) a dynamical Higgs mechanism, slightly after but independently from the publications of Peter Higgs and others. The paper was delayed by the Editorial Office of JETP, and was published only in 1966.

== Honors and awards ==
Alexander Polyakov was awarded the Dirac Medal of the ICTP and the Dannie Heineman Prize for Mathematical Physics in 1986, the Lorentz Medal in 1994, the Oskar Klein Medal in 1996, the Harvey Prize in 2010, the Lars Onsager Prize (together with A. Belavin and A. Zamolodchikov) in 2011 and the Breakthrough Prize in Fundamental Physics in 2013. On 19 November 2020 the German Physical Society announced it would award Alexander Polyakov the 2021 Max Planck Medal.

Polyakov was elected to the Soviet Academy of Sciences in 1984, to the French Academy of Sciences in 1998 and the U.S. National Academy of Sciences (NAS) in 2005.

== Political positions ==
In February-March 2022, he signed an open letter by Russian scientists condemning the 2022 Russian invasion of Ukraine, and another open letter by Breakthrough Prize laureates with the same message.

== Famous quotes ==
“The garbage of the past often becomes the treasure of the present (and vice versa).”

“There are no tables for path integrals.” (quoted in)

“I wanted to learn about elementary particles by studying boiling water.” (paraphrased in)

== See also ==
- Polyakov action
- 't Hooft–Polyakov monopole
- Belavin–Polyakov–Schwarz–Tyupkin instantons
- QCD vacuum
- Conformal bootstrap
- Liouville theory
- AdS/CFT correspondence
