= Rudolf Erdmenger =

German engineer (1911–1991)

Rudolf Erdmenger (* September 2, 1911 in Augsburg; † 1991) was a German mechanical engineer and process engineer and the main inventor of the co-rotating twin screw extruder.

== Life ==
Rudolf Erdmenger studied mechanical engineering at the Technical University of Munich, obtaining the degree of Dipl.-Ing in 1935. His first employment was at Humboldt-Deutzmotoren AG. Two years later, he changed to Maschinenfabrik Paul Leistritz in Nürnberg, where he worked on the development of screw pumps. In 1939, he moved to the Wolfen plant of I.G. Farben. There, together with Werner Meskat, he developed the co-rotating twin screw extruder, submitting the basic patent in 1944. At the end of the Second World War, Erdmenger and Meskat escaped from the approaching Red Army and joined Bayer AG in 1948, where Erdmenger founded the high viscosity technology group which he led until his retirement in 1976.

== Further technical developments ==
The co-rotating twin screw extruder was licensed in 1957 to Werner & Pfleiderer, which further developed the machine. This machine type is now the foundation for plastics compounding. Further basic patents described single- and two-lobe kneading blocks, three-lobe kneading blocks and the modular arrangement of screw elements on a central shaft The standard elements for co-rotating twin screw extruders are commonly called "Erdmenger elements" as a result. Erdmenger also worked and published on the subject of polymer devolatilization on co-rotating twin screw extruders.

== Awards ==
- 1986: Distinguished Achievement Award of the Society of Plastics Engineers (SPE)
- Membership in the Polymer Processing Hall of Fame of the University of Akron
