= Yuri Kolker =

Russian poet

- Ю́рий Ко́лкер
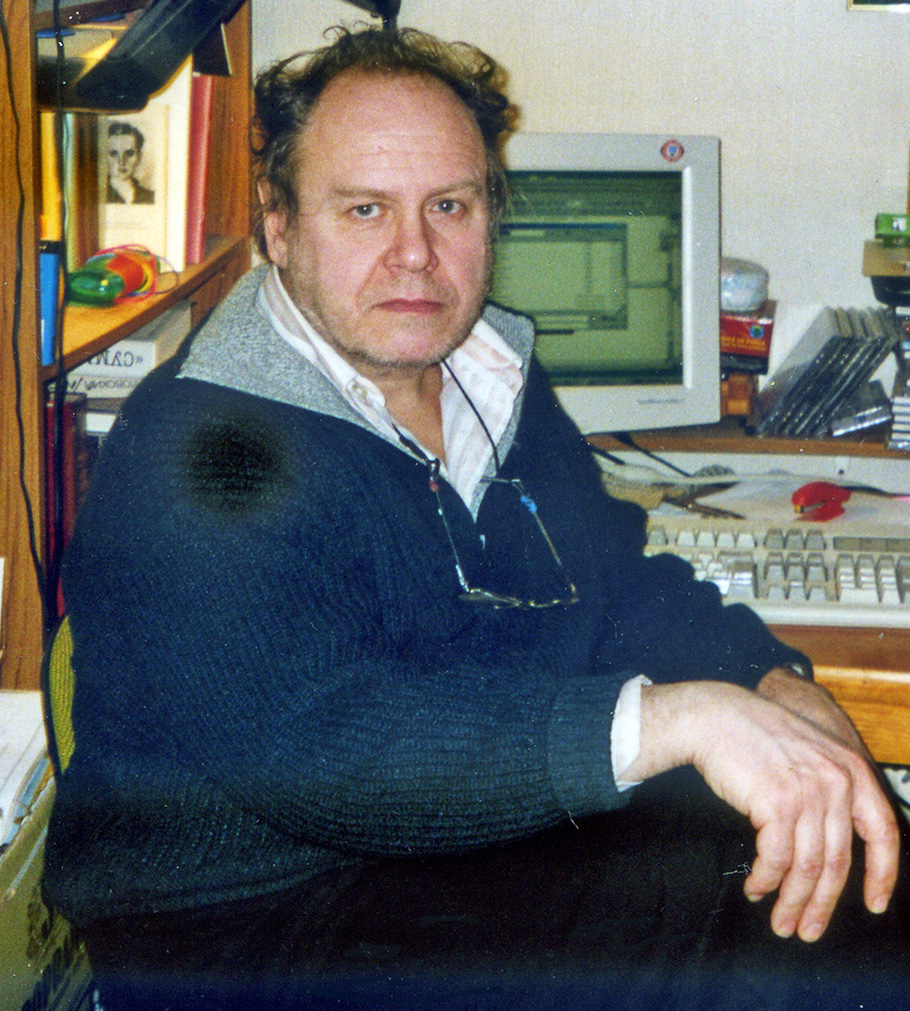
- Kolker in 2003
- Born: Yuri Iossiphovich Kolker; 14 March 1946 (age 80); Leningrad, USSR
- Citizenship: Soviet Union (1946–84); Israel (1984); United Kingdom (1996)
- Education: Leningrad Polytechnic Institute
- Occupation: Poet
- Writing career
- Language: Russian
- Notable works: Some Observations; We'll become English soil when we die; translation of Lord Tennyson The Charge of the Light Brigade
- Website: yuri-kolker.com

Yuri Kolker (14 March 1946; Russian: Ю́рий Ко́лкер, Hebrew: יורי קולקר) is a Russian poet. He is also known as an essayist, literary critic, and as a translator.

== Biography ==
Yuri Kolker was born in Leningrad in 1946, to a Russian mother and a Jewish father. Since childhood, he attended various officially authorised literary associations. In 1969, he graduated with honours from the Leningrad Polytechnic Institute and got his PhD in Physics and Mathematics in 1978. From the 1960s, he became part of the Russian Samizdat culture. By 1975, in addition to pure lyrics, civic motifs appeared in his poetry, and thereby he joined the Movement of the Soviet Dissidents. Following the Soviet invasion of Afghanistan in December 1979, Yuri Kolker quit his work in a state science research institution, cut off his few remaining ties with the Soviet officialdom and became a labourer. He lived in a communal slum, in severe poverty, making a living as a boiler-room operator. By early 1983, while being hounded the KGB, he completed for Samizdat the first ever annotated collection of poems by the then forbidden in the USSR poet Vladislav Khodasevich in two volumes. The collection was immediately re-published in Paris by La presse libre, the publishing house of the newspaper La pensée russe. In June 1984, after years as a refusenik struggling for an exit visa, he emigrated to Israel. In October 1989, he joined the London BBC Russian Service where he went on to edit the radio magazines Paradigma (1990–1999) and Yevropa (1999–2002).

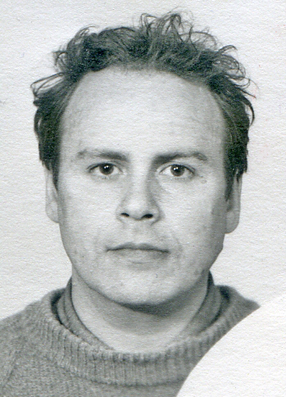
Yuri Kolker in 1977 when first applied for exit visa

== Family ==
His father, Joseph (Iosif) Kolker, was an electrical engineer educated in Germany. His mother, Valentina Chistyakova, was a housewife. His grandfather, Feodor Chistyakov, who became a Bolshevik in 1909, participated in the October Revolution, served in the Red Army as a middle ranking commissar and was buried in the prestigious Alexander Nevsky Lavra cemetery.

In 1973, Yuri Kolker married his schoolmate Tatiana (Tanya) Kostina. In 1974, their daughter Elizabeth was born.

== Poetry and essays ==
Yuri Kolker started composing poetry in the age of six but his poems were first published in a Soviet literary magazine only in 1972, when he was 26. That was an accomplishment for a completely apolitical lyrical poet. Ideological obstacles were common to all writers (all Soviet literary magazines were state institutions) but were especially harsh for people with typically Jewish surnames such as Kolker. After 1975, none of his work was published in the Soviet Union.

From 1981, and especially after his emigration in 1984, his poetry and essays were extensively published in the West: in Austria, France, Israel, the United States, Germany, Britain, Italy, and Canada. Since 1991, he has been widely published in the post-Soviet Russia and the former Soviet Baltic republics.

«Among poets whose works have not been eclipsed by their biographies; among the poetic stars shining especially bright, I want to name Yuri Kolker ... who is distinguished by his ability to create some very powerful metaphorical images that are perceived as self-valuable ... Absolutely amazing is his poem We’ll become English soil when we die, a bitter song about emigration, death and readiness to become part of English soil after a life ruined by Russia and partly recreated in Britain... One of the best in the whole volume <Yu. M. Valiyeva Collection is his poem Her biological life is over ... These two poems should be considered the classics and included in anthologies as iconic pieces...»

— Helena Eisenstein, The Literature is our Motherland, yours and mine (in Russian) (Neva magazine No 12, 2012, St.Petersburg).

His poetic work is usually understood as philosophical elegiac lyricism traditional in form, and "typically St. Petersburg perfectionist short poems". Yuri Kolker himself often emphasised his bellicose anti-avant-garde stance.

One of his most popular poems is the translation of Lord Tennyson The Charge of the Light Brigade. Yuri Kolker also translated from Shelly, Lord Byron, George Herbert, Dylan Thomas, García Lorca, Avrom Sutskever and other poets. Essays by the 19th century British historian Lord Acton translated by Yuri Kolker were published in 1992 in London and re-published in 2016 in Moscow.

Kolker is also well known for his aesthetically against-the-current non-conformist essays, including those on Khodasevich, Brodsky, Zabolotsky, Vladimir Lifshits, Yevtushenko; and his defiant memoirs, Iz pesni zlogo ne vykinesh (One can't throw out the evil from a song), V Iudeiskoy Pustune (The Desert of Milk and Honey), and others.

In 2009, Yuri Kolker published My Farewell Autobiography. He lives in the UK.

== Poem collections in Russian ==
- 1985: Poslesloviye (Epilogue). Jerusalem: Lexicon.
- 1987: Antivenok (Anti-Sequence). Sonnets. Jerusalem: Persephone.
- 1991: Daleka v chelovechestve (Distant in Humanity). Moscow: Slovo.
- 1993: Zavet i tyzhba (Percept and Litigation). St. Petersburg: Soviet Writer.
- 2000: Vetilouya (Bethulia). St. Petersburg: Helicon Plus.
- 2006: Sosredotochimsya na nesomnennom (Focus on Certitude / Selected poems). St. Petersburg: Tirex.
- 2007: Klinopis' (Cuneiform). St. Petersburg: SPbGhIPT.
- 2018: Ya poslednii i ya pervyi (My Last Ones and My First Ones), including: I. V starom svete (2001-2017) (In the Old World), II. Mlechnoye (1958-1970) (My Milky Way). Britain: Milton Herts WD6.

== Other works in Russian ==
- 1983: Collection of Poems by Vladislav Khodasevich, in two volumes, collected, edited and commented by Yuri Kolker. Paris: La presse libre.
- 1988: Jewish Samizdat, vol. 26 and 27, edited by Yuri Kolker. Jerusalem: The Hebrew University Press.
- 1989: Joseph Nedava. The Ineradicable Commissioner. Russian translation. Edited by Yuri Kolker. Tel Aviv: Moscow-Jerusalem Publishers.
- 1990: F. von Hayek. The Political Order of a Free People. Russian translation. Edited by Yuri Kolker. London: Overseas Publications Interchange Ltd.
- 1992: J. Huizinga. Historical Ideals of Life and Other Essays. Russian translation. Edited by Yuri Kolker. London: Overseas Publications Interchange Ltd.
- 1992: Lord Acton. The History of Freedom and Other Essays. Translated by Yuri Kolker. London: Overseas Publications Interchange Ltd.
- 1998: Dorling Kindersley London Guide. Translated by Yuri Kolker and Tatiana Kostina. London, New York, Stuttgart, Moscow.
- 2006: Osama bin Velimir and Other Lampoons. St. Petersburg: Tirex.
- 2008: One can't throw out the evil from a song. London: Novelize Book Print Ltd.
- 2008: The Aides Chill. Essays. St. Petertsburg: Helicon Plus.
- 2010: The Desert of Milk and Honey. Denver, Co.: HMG Press.
- 2016: Lord Acton. The Formation of Freedom. Translated by Yuri Kolker. Moscow: Socium.
