= Alexander Belavin =

Russian physicist (born 1942)

Alexander "Sasha" Abramovich Belavin (Russian: Алекса́ндр Абра́мович Бела́вин, born 1942) is a Russian physicist, known for his contributions to string theory. He is a professor at the Independent University of Moscow and a researcher at the Landau Institute for Theoretical Physics. He is also a member of the editorial board of the Moscow Mathematical Journal.

== Work ==
Belavin participated in the discovery of the BPST instanton (1975) which aided the understanding of the chiral anomaly and gave new directions within quantum field theory. With G. Avdeeva he showed evidence of new coupling regimes for gauge field theory (1973). He also developed the Belavin S-matrices, exactly solvable models in two-dimensional relativistic theories (1981). He co-authored the BPZ paper (1984) with Alexander Polyakov and Alexander Zamolodchikov on two-dimensional conformal field theory, which became important for string theory. With Vadim Knizhnik he obtained the Belavin–Knizhnik theorem on dual amplitudes in string theory (1986).

== Awards ==
- Pomeranchuk Prize 2007 for remarkable achievements in quantum field theory, such as instanton solutions in QCD, and deep insights in two-dimensional conformal string theory.
- Lars Onsager Prize 2011, with A. M. Polyakov and A. Zamolodchikov for creating conformal field theory.

== Political positions ==
In February 2022, he signed an open letter by Russian scientists condemning the 2022 Russian invasion of Ukraine.

== Publications ==
- Belavin AA; Polyakov AM; Zamolodchikov AB (1984). "Infinite conformal symmetry in two-dimensional quantum field theory". Nucl. Phys. B. 241 (2): 333–80. Bibcode:1984NuPhB.241..333B. doi:10.1016/0550-3213(84)90052-X.
- Belavin, A.; Pugai, Y.; Zamolodchikov, A. (2012). Quantum Field Theories in Two Dimensions: Collected Works of Alexei Zamolodchikov. World Scientific. ISBN 978-981-4324-06-9.

== See also ==
- Banks–Zaks fixed point
