= Arkady Vainshtein =

Russian-American theoretical physicist

Arkady Vainshtein (Russian: Аркáдий Иóсифович Вайнштéйн; born 24 February 1942) is a Russian and American Professor Emeritus of Theoretical physics who was awarded Pomeranchuk Prize (2005) and Sakurai Prize (1999) for theoretical physics.

== Biography ==
Vainshtein was born on 24 February 1942 in Novokuznetsk, Russia. He got his Ph.D. from Budker Institute of Nuclear Physics in Novosibirsk, Russia and master's degree from Novosibirsk University where he became a Professor. He was the director of William I Fine Theoretical Physics Institute, University of Minnesota where he currently serves as the Gloria Becker Lubkin chair and also holds a position as Professor since 1990. In 1997 he became a fellow at the APS and two years later was awarded Sakurai Prize. In 2004 he started to work for Kavli Institute for Theoretical Physics in Santa Barbara, California, and a year later was awarded Pomeranchuk Prize from the Institute for Theoretical and Experimental Physics, Moscow. Professor Vainshtein was awarded the 2014 Julius Wess Award by The KIT Center Elementary Particle and Astroparticle Physics (KCETA) and the 2016 Dirac Medal of the ICTP.

== See also ==
- Penguin mechanism
- Vainshtein radius
