= John Cardy =

British–American theoretical physicist

John L. Cardy
- Born: March 19, 1947 (age 79)
- Education: Cambridge University
- Known for: Cardy formula Conformal field theory Quantum quench
- Awards: Dirac Medal of the IOP (2000); Lars Onsager Prize (2004); Boltzmann Medal (2010); Dirac Medal of the ICTP (2011); Breakthrough Prize in Fundamental Physics (2024)
- Scientific career
- Fields: Theoretical Physics
- Workplaces: CERN; University of California, Santa Barbara; All Souls College, Oxford; University of California, Berkeley

John Lawrence Cardy FRS (born 19 March 1947, England) is a British–American theoretical physicist. He is best known for his work in theoretical condensed matter physics and statistical mechanics, and in particular for research on critical phenomena and two-dimensional conformal field theory.

He is most known for his contributions to conformal field theory. The Cardy formula for black hole entropy, the Cardy formula in percolation theory, and the Cardy conditions in boundary conformal field theory are named after him.

== Life ==
He was an undergraduate and postgraduate student (now an Honorary Fellow) at Downing College, Cambridge, before moving to the University of California, Santa Barbara, where he joined the faculty in 1977. In 1993, he moved to the University of Oxford, where until 2014 he was a Fellow of All Souls College (now Emeritus) and a Professor of Physics in the Rudolf Peierls Centre for Theoretical Physics. He was a Visiting Professor and then a Research Physicist (2015–2023) at the University of California, Berkeley.

His research prior to 1978 was in particle physics, in particular high energy scattering theory. After this, he applied methods of quantum field theory and the renormalization group to condensed matter, especially to critical phenomena in both pure and disordered equilibrium and non-equilibrium systems. In the 1980s he helped develop the theory of conformal invariance and its applications to these problems, ideas which also had an impact in string theory and the physics of black holes.

In the 1990s he used conformal invariance to derive many exact results in percolation and related probabilistic problems. This helped inspire the work of mathematicians which was recognised by the award of the Fields Medal to Wendelin Werner in 2006, and to Stanislav Smirnov in 2010. More recently he has worked on questions of quantum entanglement and non-equilibrium dynamics in many-body systems, and on non-local field theory.

== Honours and awards ==
He was elected as a Fellow of the Royal Society in 1991, received the Dirac Medal of the Institute of Physics (UK) in 2000, was awarded the Lars Onsager Prize by the APS in 2004, the Boltzmann Medal by IUPAP in 2010, the Dirac Medal of the International Centre for Theoretical Physics in 2011, and the Breakthrough Prize in Fundamental Physics in 2024.

== Selected works ==
- Scaling and renormalization in statistical physics. Cambridge University Press, 1996
- with Krzysztof Gawędzki, Gregory Falkovich: Non equilibrium statistical mechanics and turbulence. London Mathematical Society Lecture notes, Cambridge University Press, 2008
- Conformal Invariance and Statistical Mechanics. in Les Houches Lectures, vol. 49, 1988
- as editor: Finite Size Scaling. Elsevier 1988
- Cardy Conformal Invariance in Percolation, Self-Avoiding Walks and Related Problems, 2002
- Cardy Conformal field theory and statistical mechanics, Les Houches Lectures 2008
- Cardy, Pasquale Calabrese Entanglement entropy and conformal field theory, J. Phys. A, 42, 2009
- Cardy Entanglement entropy in extended quantum systems, 2007
