= Institute for Theoretical and Experimental Physics =

Physics institute in Russia

Coordinates: 55°40′40″N 37°35′12″E

Institute for Theoretical and Experimental Physics (ITEP) Институт теоретической и экспериментальной физики
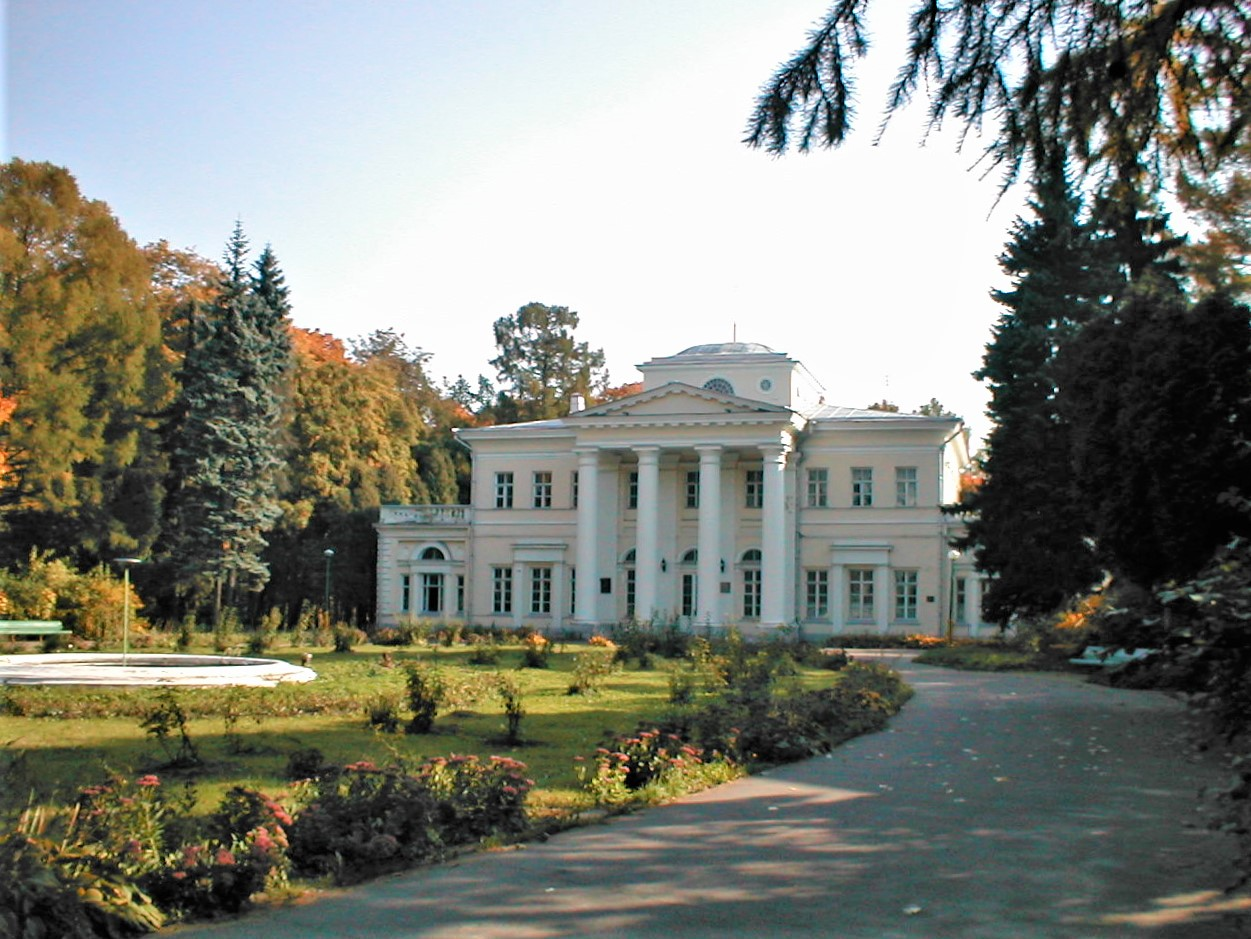
- ITEP main building
- Formation: 1945; 81 years ago
- Founder: Abram Alikhanov
- Headquarters: Moscow, Russia
- Official languages: Russian
- Director General: Viktor Yegorychev
- Website: www.itep.ru

The Institute for Theoretical and Experimental Physics (ITEP; Russian Институт теоретической и экспериментальной физики) is a multi-disciplinary research center located in Moscow, Russia. ITEP carries out research in the fields of theoretical and mathematical physics, astrophysics, high energy particle physics, nuclear physics, plasma physics, solid state physics, nanotechnology, reactor and accelerator physics, medical physics, and computer science. ITEP also maintains an extensive educational program and organizes physics schools for scholars and undergraduates. The institute is located near the corner of the Sevastopol prospect and the Nachimowski prospect (address Bolschaja Cheremuskinskaja 25) and occupies part of the former estate Cheryomushki-Znamenskoye – an 18th-century manor that is a monument of architecture and landscape art of the 18th–19th centuries.

== History ==
ITEP was established on December 1, 1945, initially carrying the name "Laboratory №3", with the purpose of conceiving a heavy water nuclear reactor and cosmic ray studies. Developed of the theoretical part KS 150. The laboratory worked with nuclear reactor development in the 1940s and over the years the institute expanded its research programme into high energy particle physics, astrophysics, medical physics and other related fields.

The founder and director until 1968 was Abram Alikhanov.

ITEP scientists won 8 Lenin awards and 29 state awards during the Soviet Union.

A research program to research nuclear fusion using heavy ion accelerators was started in the 1980s.

At the moment (2008), the focus areas are theoretical and mathematical physics (e.g. quantum field theory and string theory), astrophysics, elementary particle physics (e.g. they are involved in working with DESY and CERN experiments), nuclear physics, plasma physics, solid state physics, nanotechnologies, nuclear reactor technology, accelerator physics, medical physics (such as PET devices, cancer treatment with the proton accelerator) and computer science. They were one of the first Russian institutes networked on the World Wide Web and operate the Moscow mirror of the Arxiv preprint server.

== Facilities ==
From 1949 the ITEP maintained a heavy water reactor (there is still a Maket heavy water reactor there) and from 1961 a 7 GeV proton synchrotron, the first Russian particle accelerator with strong focus and prototype for the later 70 GeV accelerator in Protvino. Today they maintain a 10 GeV proton synchrotron and a proton linear accelerator.

== Research ==
The school conducts original scientific research in several fields of physics and technology. Research areas in theoretical physics concentrate around quantum field theory including the string theory. Experimental research includes active participation in large international projects, such as the CERN's LHC experiments, as well as smaller, national and locally managed projects. The employees are also active in teaching (at undergraduate and masters levels as well as doctorates) and regularly organize conferences, seminars and a winter school.

== 2012 controversy ==
A large group of scientists at the ITEP were protesting about the Russian government's plan to merge ITEP with the Kurchatov Institute. According to them, the real purpose of the move is to effectively "kill" ITEP.

== Directors ==
- 1945–1968 Abram Alikhanov
- 1968–1997 Ivan Chuvilo
- 1997–2001 Mikhail Danilov
- 2001–2005 Alexander Suvorov
- 2005–2008 Boris Sharkov
- 2008–2009 Vyacheslav Konev
- 2009–2010 Nikolai Tyurin
- 2010 Vladimir Shevchenko
- 2010–2015 Yuri Kozlov
- Since 2015 Viktor Yegorychev

== People ==
The Russian theoretical physicists Lev Landau (ITEP considers themselves in the tradition of the Landau school) and Isaak Yakovlevich Pomeranchuk, who led a seminar here from the 1950s, were of particular importance. The well-known textbook on quantum electrodynamics by Aleksander Akhiezer and Vladimir Berestetsky was created at the institute in 1953. The ITEP achieved success for example with scientists such as Mikhail Shifman, Boris Ioffe, Arkady Vainshtein, Mikhail Voloshin, Victor Novikov and Valentin Ivanovich Zakharov in quantum chromodynamics in the 1980s. Other theorists were Vadim Knizhnik, Alexei Morozov, Igor Krichever and Sergei Gukov in the field of string theory, quantum field theory and mathematical physics, Alexander Dolgov in cosmology, Igor Kobzarev, Michael Marinov. Other important theoretical physicists at the institute were Karen Ter-Martirosian and Lev Okun, both of whom were responsible for the selection of scientists during the Soviet Union, which at the time amounted to a strict "screening".

== Pomeranchuk Prize ==
Since 1998 ITEP has awarded annually the Pomeranchuk Prize, an international award for theoretical physics. It is named after Russian physicist Isaak Yakovlevich Pomeranchuk, who together with Landau established the Theoretical Physics Department of the Institute.

== See also ==
- Budker Institute of Nuclear Physics, another Russian particle physics laboratory in Novosibirsk
- Institute for High Energy Physics, another Russian particle physics laboratory in the vicinity of Moscow; located south of Moscow
- Joint Institute for Nuclear Research, international particle physics laboratory in the vicinity of Moscow; located north of Moscow
