= Conformal field theory =

Quantum field theory enjoying conformal symmetry

A conformal field theory (CFT) is a quantum field theory that is invariant under conformal transformations. In two dimensions, there is an infinite-dimensional algebra of local conformal transformations, and conformal field theories can sometimes be exactly solved or classified.

Conformal field theory has important applications to condensed matter physics, statistical mechanics, quantum statistical mechanics, and string theory. Statistical and condensed matter systems are indeed often conformally invariant at their thermodynamic or quantum critical points.

== Scale invariance vs conformal invariance ==
In quantum field theory, scale invariance is a common and natural symmetry, because any fixed point of the renormalization group is by definition scale invariant. Conformal symmetry is stronger than scale invariance, and one needs additional assumptions to argue that it should appear in nature. The basic idea behind its plausibility is that local scale invariant theories have their currents given by $T_{\mu \nu} \xi^\nu$ where $\xi^\nu$ is a Killing vector and $T_{\mu \nu}$ is a conserved operator (the stress-tensor) of dimension exactly $d$. For the associated symmetries to include scale but not conformal transformations, the trace $T_\mu{}^\mu$ has to be a non-zero total derivative implying that there is a non-conserved operator of dimension exactly $d - 1$.

Under some assumptions it is possible to completely rule out this type of non-renormalization and hence prove that scale invariance implies conformal invariance in a quantum field theory, for example in unitary compact conformal field theories in two dimensions.

While it is possible for a quantum field theory to be scale invariant but not conformally invariant, examples are rare. For this reason, the terms are often used interchangeably in the context of quantum field theory.

== Two dimensions vs higher dimensions ==
The number of independent conformal transformations is infinite in two dimensions, and finite in higher dimensions. This makes conformal symmetry much more constraining in two dimensions. All conformal field theories share the ideas and techniques of the conformal bootstrap. But the resulting equations are more powerful in two dimensions, where they are sometimes exactly solvable (for example in the case of minimal models), in contrast to higher dimensions, where numerical approaches dominate.

The development of conformal field theory has been earlier and deeper in the two-dimensional case, in particular after the 1983 article by Belavin, Polyakov and Zamolodchikov. The term conformal field theory has sometimes been used with the meaning of two-dimensional conformal field theory, as in the title of a 1997 textbook. Higher-dimensional conformal field theories have become more popular with the AdS/CFT correspondence in the late 1990s, and the development of numerical conformal bootstrap techniques in the 2000s.

=== Global vs local conformal symmetry in two dimensions ===
The global conformal group of the Riemann sphere is the group of Möbius transformations $\mathrm{PSL}_2(\mathbb{C})$, which is finite-dimensional. On the other hand, infinitesimal conformal transformations form the infinite-dimensional Witt algebra: the conformal Killing equations in two dimensions, $\partial_\mu \xi_\nu + \partial_\nu \xi_\mu = \partial \cdot\xi \eta_{\mu \nu},~$ reduce to just the Cauchy-Riemann equations, $\partial_{\bar{z} } \xi(z) = 0 = \partial_z \xi (\bar{z})$, the infinity of modes of arbitrary analytic coordinate transformations $\xi(z)$ yield the infinity of Killing vector fields $z^n\partial_z$.

Strictly speaking, it is possible for a two-dimensional conformal field theory to be local (in the sense of possessing a stress-tensor) while still only exhibiting invariance under the global $\mathrm{PSL}_2(\mathbb{C})$. This turns out to be unique to non-unitary theories; an example is the biharmonic scalar. This property should be viewed as even more special than scale without conformal invariance as it requires $T_\mu{}^\mu$ to be a total second derivative.

Global conformal symmetry in two dimensions is a special case of conformal symmetry in higher dimensions, and is studied with the same techniques. This is done not only in theories that have global but not local conformal symmetry, but also in theories that do have local conformal symmetry, for the purpose of testing techniques or ideas from higher-dimensional CFT. In particular, numerical bootstrap techniques can be tested by applying them to minimal models, and comparing the results with the known analytic results that follow from local conformal symmetry.

=== Conformal field theories with a Virasoro symmetry algebra ===
In a conformally invariant two-dimensional quantum theory, the Witt algebra of infinitesimal conformal transformations has to be centrally extended. The quantum symmetry algebra is therefore the Virasoro algebra, which depends on a number called the central charge. This central extension can also be understood in terms of a conformal anomaly.

It was shown by Alexander Zamolodchikov that there exists a function which decreases monotonically under the renormalization group flow of a two-dimensional quantum field theory, and is equal to the central charge for a two-dimensional conformal field theory. This is known as the Zamolodchikov C-theorem, and tells us that renormalization group flow in two dimensions is irreversible.

In addition to being centrally extended, the symmetry algebra of a conformally invariant quantum theory has to be complexified, resulting in two copies of the Virasoro algebra. In Euclidean CFT, these copies are called holomorphic and antiholomorphic. In Lorentzian CFT, they are called left-moving and right moving. Both copies have the same central charge.

The space of states of a theory is a representation of the product of the two Virasoro algebras. This space is a Hilbert space if the theory is unitary. This space may contain a vacuum state, or in statistical mechanics, a thermal state. Unless the central charge vanishes, there cannot exist a state that leaves the entire infinite dimensional conformal symmetry unbroken. The best we can have is a state that is invariant under the generators $L_{n\geq -1}$ of the Virasoro algebra, whose basis is $(L_n)_{n\in\mathbb{Z} }$. This contains the generators $L_{-1},L_0,L_1$ of the global conformal transformations. The rest of the conformal group is spontaneously broken.

== Conformal symmetry ==
=== Definition and Jacobian ===
For a given spacetime and metric, a conformal transformation is a transformation that preserves angles. We will focus on conformal transformations of the flat $d$-dimensional Euclidean space $\mathbb{R}^d$ or of the Minkowski space $\mathbb{R}^{1,d-1}$.

If $x\to f(x)$ is a conformal transformation, the Jacobian $J^\mu_\nu(x) = \frac{\partial f^\mu(x)}{\partial x^\nu}$ is of the form

$$J^\mu_\nu(x) = \Omega(x) R^\mu_\nu(x),$$

where $\Omega(x)$ is the scale factor, and $R^\mu_\nu(x)$ is a rotation (i.e. an orthogonal matrix) or Lorentz transformation.

=== Conformal group ===
The conformal group of Euclidean space is locally isomorphic to $\mathrm{SO}(1, d + 1)$, and of Minkowski space is $\mathrm{SO}(2,d)$. This includes translations, rotations (Euclidean) or Lorentz transformations (Minkowski), and dilations i.e. scale transformations

$$x^\mu \to \lambda x^\mu.$$

This also includes special conformal transformations. For any translation $T_a(x) = x + a$, there is a special conformal transformation

$$S_a = I \circ T_a \circ I,$$

where $I$ is the inversion such that

$$I\left(x^\mu\right) = \frac{x^\mu}{x^2}.$$

In the sphere $S^d = \mathbb{R}^d \cup \{\infty\}$, the inversion exchanges $0$ with $\infty$. Translations leave $\infty$ fixed, while special conformal transformations leave $0$ fixed.

=== Conformal algebra ===
The commutation relations of the corresponding Lie algebra are

$$\begin{align}[]
[P_\mu, P_\nu] &=  0, \\[]
[D, K_\mu] &= -K_\mu, \\[]
[D, P_\mu] &=  P_\mu, \\[]
[K_\mu, K_\nu] &=  0, \\[]
[K_\mu, P_\nu] &=  \eta_{\mu\nu}D - iM_{\mu\nu},
\end{align}$$

where $P$ generate translations, $D$ generates dilations, $K_\mu$ generate special conformal transformations, and $M_{\mu\nu}$ generate rotations or Lorentz transformations. The tensor $\eta_{\mu\nu}$ is the flat metric.

=== Global issues in Minkowski space ===
In Minkowski space, the conformal group does not preserve causality. Observables such as correlation functions are invariant under the conformal algebra, but not under the conformal group. As shown by Lüscher and Mack, it is possible to restore the invariance under the conformal group by extending the flat Minkowski space into a Lorentzian cylinder. The original Minkowski space is conformally equivalent to a region of the cylinder called a Poincaré patch. In the cylinder, global conformal transformations do not violate causality: instead, they can move points outside the Poincaré patch.

== Correlation functions and conformal bootstrap ==
In the conformal bootstrap approach, a conformal field theory is a set of correlation functions that obey a number of axioms.

The $n$-point correlation function $\left\langle O_1(x_1)\cdots O_n(x_n)\right\rangle$ is a function of the positions $x_i$ and other parameters of the fields $O_1,\dots ,O_n$. In the bootstrap approach, the fields themselves make sense only in the context of correlation functions, and may be viewed as efficient notations for writing axioms for correlation functions. Correlation functions depend linearly on fields, in particular $\partial_{x_1} \left\langle O_1(x_1)\cdots \right\rangle = \left\langle \partial_{x_1}O_1(x_1)\cdots \right\rangle$.

We focus on CFT on the Euclidean space $\mathbb{R}^d$. In this case, correlation functions are Schwinger functions. They are defined for $x_i\neq x_j$, and do not depend on the order of the fields. In Minkowski space, correlation functions are Wightman functions. They can depend on the order of the fields, as fields commute only if they are spacelike separated. A Euclidean CFT can be related to a Minkowskian CFT by Wick rotation, for example thanks to the Osterwalder-Schrader theorem. In such cases, Minkowskian correlation functions are obtained from Euclidean correlation functions by an analytic continuation that depends on the order of the fields.

=== Behaviour under conformal transformations ===
Any conformal transformation $x\to f(x)$ acts linearly on fields $O(x) \to \pi_f(O)(x)$, such that $f\to \pi_f$ is a representation of the conformal group, and correlation functions are invariant:

$$\left\langle\pi_f(O_1)(x_1)\cdots \pi_f(O_n)(x_n) \right\rangle = \left\langle O_1(x_1)\cdots O_n(x_n)\right\rangle.$$

Primary fields are fields that transform into themselves via $\pi_f$. The behaviour of a primary field is characterized by a number $\Delta$ called its conformal dimension, and a representation $\rho$ of the rotation or Lorentz group. For a primary field, we then have

$$\pi_f(O)(x) = \Omega(x')^{-\Delta} \rho(R(x')) O(x'), \quad \text{where}\ x'=f^{-1}(x).$$

Here $\Omega(x)$ and $R(x)$ are the scale factor and rotation that are associated to the conformal transformation $f$. The representation $\rho$ is trivial in the case of scalar fields, which transform as $\pi_f(O)(x) = \Omega(x')^{-\Delta} O(x')$. For vector fields, the representation $\rho$ is the fundamental representation, and we would have $\pi_f(O_\mu)(x) = \Omega(x')^{-\Delta} R_\mu^\nu(x') O_\nu(x')$.

A primary field that is characterized by the conformal dimension $\Delta$ and representation $\rho$ behaves as a highest-weight vector in an induced representation of the conformal group from the subgroup generated by dilations and rotations. In particular, the conformal dimension $\Delta$ characterizes a representation of the subgroup of dilations. In two dimensions, the fact that this induced representation is a Verma module appears throughout the literature. For higher-dimensional CFTs (in which the maximally compact subalgebra is larger than the Cartan subalgebra), it has recently been appreciated that this representation is a parabolic or generalized Verma module.

Derivatives (of any order) of primary fields are called descendant fields. Their behaviour under conformal transformations is more complicated. For example, if $O$ is a primary field, then $\pi_f(\partial_\mu O)(x) = \partial_\mu\left(\pi_f(O)(x)\right)$ is a linear combination of $\partial_\mu O$ and $O$. Correlation functions of descendant fields can be deduced from correlation functions of primary fields. However, even in the common case where all fields are either primaries or descendants thereof, descendant fields play an important role, because conformal blocks and operator product expansions involve sums over all descendant fields.

The collection of all primary fields $O_p$, characterized by their scaling dimensions $\Delta_p$ and the representations $\rho_p$, is called the spectrum of the theory.

=== Dependence on field positions ===
The invariance of correlation functions under conformal transformations severely constrain their dependence on field positions. In the case of two- and three-point functions, that dependence is determined up to finitely many constant coefficients. Higher-point functions have more freedom, and are only determined up to functions of conformally invariant combinations of the positions.

The two-point function of two primary fields vanishes if their conformal dimensions differ.

$$\Delta_1\neq \Delta_2 \implies \left\langle O_{1}(x_1)O_{2}(x_2)\right\rangle= 0.$$

If the dilation operator is diagonalizable (i.e. if the theory is not logarithmic), there exists a basis of primary fields such that two-point functions are diagonal, i.e. $i\neq j\implies \left\langle O_i O_j\right\rangle = 0$. In this case, the two-point function of a scalar primary field is

$$\left\langle O(x_1)O(x_2) \right\rangle = \frac{1}{|x_1-x_2|^{2\Delta}},$$

where we choose the normalization of the field such that the constant coefficient, which is not determined by conformal symmetry, is one. Similarly, two-point functions of non-scalar primary fields are determined up to a coefficient, which can be set to one. In the case of a symmetric traceless tensor of rank $\ell$, the two-point function is

$$\left\langle O_{\mu_1,\dots,\mu_\ell}(x_1) O_{\nu_1,\dots,\nu_\ell}(x_2)\right\rangle = \frac{\prod_{i=1}^\ell I_{\mu_i,\nu_i}(x_1-x_2) - \text{traces}}{|x_1-x_2|^{2\Delta}},$$

where the tensor $I_{\mu,\nu}(x)$ is defined as

$$I_{\mu,\nu}(x) = \eta_{\mu\nu} - \frac{2x_\mu x_\nu}{x^2}.$$

The three-point function of three scalar primary fields is

$$\left\langle O_{1}(x_1)O_{2}(x_2)O_{3}(x_3)\right\rangle = \frac{C_{123}}{|x_{12}|^{\Delta_1+\Delta_2-\Delta_3}|x_{13}|^{\Delta_1+\Delta_3-\Delta_2} |x_{23}|^{\Delta_2+\Delta_3-\Delta_1}},$$

where $x_{ij}=x_i-x_j$, and $C_{123}$ is a three-point structure constant. With primary fields that are not necessarily scalars, conformal symmetry allows a finite number of tensor structures, and there is a structure constant for each tensor structure. In the case of two scalar fields and a symmetric traceless tensor of rank $\ell$, there is only one tensor structure, and the three-point function is

$$\left\langle O_{1}(x_1)O_{2}(x_2)O_{\mu_1,\dots,\mu_\ell}(x_3)\right\rangle
= \frac{C_{123}\left(\prod_{i=1}^\ell V_{\mu_i}-\text{traces}\right)}{|x_{12}|^{\Delta_1+\Delta_2-\Delta_3}|x_{13}|^{\Delta_1+\Delta_3-\Delta_2} |x_{23}|^{\Delta_2+\Delta_3-\Delta_1}},$$

where we introduce the vector

$$V_\mu = \frac{x_{13}^\mu x_{23}^2 - x_{23}^\mu x_{13}^2}{|x_{12}||x_{13}||x_{23}|}.$$

Four-point functions of scalar primary fields are determined up to arbitrary functions $g(u,v)$ of the two cross-ratios

$$u = \frac{x_{12}^2 x_{34}^2}{x_{13}^2 x_{24}^2} \ , \ v = \frac{x_{14}^2 x_{23}^2}{x_{13}^2 x_{24}^2}.$$

The four-point function is then

$$\left\langle \prod_{i=1}^4O_i(x_i)\right\rangle = \frac{\left(\frac{|x_{24}|}{|x_{14}|}\right)^{\Delta_1-\Delta_2} \left(\frac{|x_{14}|}{|x_{13}|}\right)^{\Delta_3-\Delta_4}}{|x_{12}|^{\Delta_1+\Delta_2} |x_{34}|^{\Delta_3+\Delta_4}}g(u,v).$$

=== Operator product expansion ===
The operator product expansion (OPE) is more powerful in conformal field theory than in more general quantum field theories. This is because in conformal field theory, the operator product expansion's radius of convergence is finite (i.e. it is not zero). Provided the positions $x_1,x_2$ of two fields are close enough, the operator product expansion rewrites the product of these two fields as a linear combination of fields at a given point, which can be chosen as $x_2$ for technical convenience.

The operator product expansion of two fields takes the form

$$O_1(x_1)O_2(x_2) = \sum_k c_{12k}(x_1-x_2) O_k(x_2),$$

where $c_{12k}(x)$ is some coefficient function, and the sum in principle runs over all fields in the theory. (Equivalently, by the state-field correspondence, the sum runs over all states in the space of states.) Some fields may actually be absent, in particular due to constraints from symmetry: conformal symmetry, or extra symmetries.

If all fields are primary or descendant, the sum over fields can be reduced to a sum over primaries, by rewriting the contributions of any descendant in terms of the contribution of the corresponding primary:

$$O_1(x_1)O_2(x_2) = \sum_p C_{12p}P_p(x_1-x_2,\partial_{x_2}) O_p(x_2),$$

where the fields $O_p$ are all primary, and $C_{12p}$ is the three-point structure constant (which for this reason is also called OPE coefficient). The differential operator $P_p(x_1-x_2,\partial_{x_2})$ is an infinite series in derivatives, which is determined by conformal symmetry and therefore in principle known.

Viewing the OPE as a relation between correlation functions shows that the OPE must be associative. Furthermore, if the space is Euclidean, the OPE must be commutative, because correlation functions do not depend on the order of the fields, i.e. $O_1(x_1)O_2(x_2) = O_2(x_2)O_1(x_1)$.

The existence of the operator product expansion is a fundamental axiom of the conformal bootstrap. However, it is generally not necessary to compute operator product expansions and in particular the differential operators $P_p(x_1-x_2,\partial_{x_2})$. Rather, it is the decomposition of correlation functions into structure constants and conformal blocks that is needed. The OPE can in principle be used for computing conformal blocks, but in practice there are more efficient methods.

=== Conformal blocks and crossing symmetry ===
Using the OPE $O_1(x_1)O_2(x_2)$, a four-point function can be written as a combination of three-point structure constants and s-channel conformal blocks,

$$\left\langle \prod_{i=1}^4 O_i(x_i) \right\rangle = \sum_p C_{12p}C_{p34} G_p^{(s)}(x_i).$$

The conformal block $G_p^{(s)}(x_i)$ is the sum of the contributions of the primary field $O_p$ and its descendants. It depends on the fields $O_i$ and their positions. If the three-point functions $\left\langle O_1O_2O_p\right\rangle$ or $\left\langle O_3O_4O_p\right\rangle$ involve several independent tensor structures, the structure constants and conformal blocks depend on these tensor structures, and the primary field $O_p$ contributes several independent blocks. Conformal blocks are determined by conformal symmetry, and known in principle. To compute them, there are recursion relations and integrable techniques.

Using the OPE $O_1(x_1)O_4(x_4)$ or $O_1(x_1)O_3(x_3)$, the same four-point function is written in terms of t-channel conformal blocks or u-channel conformal blocks,

$$\left\langle \prod_{i=1}^4 O_i(x_i) \right\rangle = \sum_p C_{14p}C_{p23} G_p^{(t)}(x_i)
=\sum_p C_{13p}C_{p24} G_p^{(u)}(x_i).$$

The equality of the s-, t- and u-channel decompositions is called crossing symmetry: a constraint on the spectrum of primary fields, and on the three-point structure constants.

Conformal blocks obey the same conformal symmetry constraints as four-point functions. In particular, s-channel conformal blocks can be written in terms of functions $g_p^{(s)}(u,v)$ of the cross-ratios. While the OPE $O_1(x_1)O_2(x_2)$ only converges if $\vert x_{12}\vert <\min(\vert x_{23}\vert ,\vert x_{24}\vert)$, conformal blocks can be analytically continued to all (non pairwise coinciding) values of the positions. In Euclidean space, conformal blocks are single-valued real-analytic functions of the positions except when the four points $x_i$ lie on a circle but in a singly-transposed cyclic order [1324], and only in these exceptional cases does the decomposition into conformal blocks not converge.

A conformal field theory in flat Euclidean space $\mathbb{R}^d$ is thus defined by its spectrum $\{(\Delta_p,\rho_p)\}$ and OPE coefficients (or three-point structure constants) $\{C_{pp'p' '}\}$, satisfying the constraint that all four-point functions are crossing-symmetric. From the spectrum and OPE coefficients (collectively referred to as the CFT data), correlation functions of arbitrary order can be computed.

== Features ==
=== Unitarity ===
A conformal field theory is unitary if its space of states has a positive definite scalar product such that the dilation operator is self-adjoint. Then the scalar product endows the space of states with the structure of a Hilbert space.

In Euclidean conformal field theories, unitarity is equivalent to reflection positivity of correlation functions: one of the Osterwalder-Schrader axioms.

Unitarity implies that the conformal dimensions of primary fields are real and bounded from below. The lower bound depends on the spacetime dimension $d$, and on the representation of the rotation or Lorentz group in which the primary field transforms. For scalar fields, the unitarity bound is

$$\Delta \geq \frac12(d-2).$$

In a unitary theory, three-point structure constants must be real, which in turn implies that four-point functions obey certain inequalities. Powerful numerical bootstrap methods are based on exploiting these inequalities.

=== Compactness ===
A conformal field theory is compact if it obeys three conditions:

- All conformal dimensions are real.
- For any $\Delta\in\mathbb{R}$ there are finitely many states whose dimensions are less than $\Delta$.
- There is a unique state with the dimension $\Delta =0$, and it is the vacuum state, i.e. the corresponding field is the identity field.

(The identity field is the field whose insertion into correlation functions does not modify them, i.e. $\left\langle I(x)\cdots \right\rangle = \left\langle \cdots \right\rangle$.) The name comes from the fact that if a 2D conformal field theory is also a sigma model, it will satisfy these conditions if and only if its target space is compact.

It is believed that all unitary conformal field theories are compact in dimension $d>2$. Without unitarity, on the other hand, it is possible to find CFTs in dimension four and in dimension $4 - \epsilon$ that have a continuous spectrum. And in dimension two, Liouville theory is unitary but not compact.

=== Extra symmetries ===
A conformal field theory may have extra symmetries in addition to conformal symmetry. For example, the Ising model has a $\mathbb{Z}_2$ symmetry, and superconformal field theories have supersymmetry.

== Examples ==
=== Mean field theory ===
A generalized free field is a field whose correlation functions are deduced from its two-point function by Wick's theorem. For instance, if $\phi$ is a scalar primary field of dimension $\Delta$, its four-point function reads

$$\left\langle \prod_{i=1}^4\phi(x_i) \right\rangle = \frac{1}{|x_{12}|^{2\Delta}|x_{34}|^{2\Delta}} + \frac{1}{|x_{13}|^{2\Delta}|x_{24}|^{2\Delta}} + \frac{1}{|x_{14}|^{2\Delta}|x_{23}|^{2\Delta}}.$$

For instance, if $\phi_1,\phi_2$ are two scalar primary fields such that $\langle \phi_1\phi_2\rangle=0$ (which is the case in particular if $\Delta_1\neq\Delta_2$), we have the four-point function

$$\Big\langle \phi_1(x_1)\phi_1(x_2)\phi_2(x_3)\phi_2(x_4)\Big\rangle = \frac{1}{|x_{12}|^{2\Delta_1}|x_{34}|^{2\Delta_2}}.$$

Mean field theory is a generic name for conformal field theories that are built from generalized free fields. For example, a mean field theory can be built from one scalar primary field $\phi$. Then this theory contains $\phi$, its descendant fields, and the fields that appear in the OPE \phi \phi. The primary fields that appear in $\phi \phi$ can be determined by decomposing the four-point function $\langle\phi\phi\phi\phi\rangle$ in conformal blocks: their conformal dimensions belong to $2\Delta+2\mathbb{N}$: in mean field theory, the conformal dimension is conserved modulo integers. Structure constants can be computed exactly in terms of the Gamma function.

Similarly, it is possible to construct mean field theories starting from a field with non-trivial Lorentz spin. For example, the 4d Maxwell theory (in the absence of charged matter fields) is a mean field theory built out of an antisymmetric tensor field $F_{\mu \nu}$ with scaling dimension $\Delta = 2$.

Mean field theories have a Lagrangian description in terms of a quadratic action involving Laplacian raised to an arbitrary real power (which determines the scaling dimension of the field). For a generic scaling dimension, the power of the Laplacian is non-integer. The corresponding mean field theory is then non-local (e.g. it does not have a conserved stress tensor operator).

=== Critical Ising model ===
The critical Ising model is the critical point of the Ising model on a hypercubic lattice in two or three dimensions. It has a $\mathbb{Z}_2$ global symmetry, corresponding to flipping all spins. The two-dimensional critical Ising model includes the $\mathcal{M}(4,3)$ Virasoro minimal model, which can be solved exactly. The three-dimensional critical Ising model is not exactly solved, but its universality class describes not just the magnetization of the critical 3D Ising model but also the critical opalescence of fluids at their critical point. There is no Ising CFT in $d \geq 4$ dimensions.

=== Critical Potts model ===
The critical Potts model with $q=2,3,4,\cdots$ colors is a unitary CFT that is invariant under the permutation group $S_q$. It is a generalization of the critical Ising model, which corresponds to $q=2$. The critical Potts model exists in a range of dimensions depending on $q$.

The critical Potts model may be constructed as the continuum limit of the Potts model on d-dimensional hypercubic lattice. In the Fortuin-Kasteleyn reformulation in terms of clusters, the Potts model can be defined for $q\in\mathbb{C}$, but it is not unitary if $q$ is not integer.

=== Critical O(N) model ===
The critical O(N) model is a CFT invariant under the orthogonal group. For any integer $N$, it exists as an interacting, unitary and compact CFT in $d=3$ dimensions (and for $N=1$ also in two dimensions). It is a generalization of the critical Ising model, which corresponds to the O(N) CFT at $N=1$.

The O(N) CFT can be constructed as the continuum limit of a lattice model with spins that are N-vectors, called the n-vector model.

Alternatively, the critical $O(N)$ model can be constructed as the $\varepsilon \to 1$ limit of Wilson–Fisher fixed point in $d=4-\varepsilon$ dimensions. At $\varepsilon = 0$, the Wilson–Fisher fixed point becomes the tensor product of $N$ free scalars with dimension $\Delta = 1$. For $0 < \varepsilon < 1$ the model in question is non-unitary.

When N is large, the O(N) model can be solved perturbatively in a 1/N expansion by means of the Hubbard–Stratonovich transformation. In particular, the $N \to \infty$ limit of the critical O(N) model is well-understood.

The conformal data of the critical O(N) model are functions of N and of the dimension, on which many results are known.

=== Conformal gauge theories ===
Some conformal field theories in three and four dimensions admit a Lagrangian description in the form of a gauge theory, either abelian or non-abelian. Examples of such CFTs are conformal QED with sufficiently many charged fields in $d=3$ or the Banks-Zaks fixed point in $d=4$.

== Applications ==
=== Continuous phase transitions ===
Continuous phase transitions (critical points) of classical statistical physics systems with D spatial dimensions are often described by Euclidean conformal field theories. A necessary condition for this to happen is that the critical point should be invariant under spatial rotations and translations. However this condition is not sufficient: some exceptional critical points are described by scale invariant but not conformally invariant theories. If the classical statistical physics system is reflection positive, the corresponding Euclidean CFT describing its critical point will be unitary.

Continuous quantum phase transitions in condensed matter systems with D spatial dimensions may be described by Lorentzian D+1 dimensional conformal field theories (related by Wick rotation to Euclidean CFTs in D + 1 dimensions). Apart from translation and rotation invariance, an additional necessary condition for this to happen is that the dynamical critical exponent z should be equal to 1. CFTs describing such quantum phase transitions (in absence of quenched disorder) are always unitary.

=== String theory ===
World-sheet description of string theory involves a two-dimensional CFT coupled to dynamical two-dimensional quantum gravity (or supergravity, in case of superstring theory). Consistency of string theory models imposes constraints on the central charge of this CFT, which should be c = 26 in bosonic string theory and c = 10 in superstring theory. Coordinates of the spacetime in which string theory lives correspond to bosonic fields of this CFT.

=== AdS/CFT correspondence ===
Conformal field theories play a prominent role in the AdS/CFT correspondence, in which a gravitational theory in anti-de Sitter space (AdS) is equivalent to a conformal field theory on the AdS boundary. Notable examples are d = 4, N = 4 supersymmetric Yang–Mills theory, which is dual to Type IIB string theory on AdS_{5} × S^{5}, and d = 3, N = 6 super-Chern–Simons theory, which is dual to M-theory on AdS_{4} × S^{7}. (The prefix "super" denotes supersymmetry, N denotes the degree of extended supersymmetry possessed by the theory, and d the number of space-time dimensions on the boundary.)

=== Conformal perturbation theory ===
By perturbing a conformal field theory, it is possible to construct other field theories, conformal or not. Their correlation functions can be computed perturbatively from the correlation functions of the original CFT, by a technique called conformal perturbation theory.

For example, a type of perturbation consists in discretizing a conformal field theory by studying it on a discrete spacetime. The resulting finite-size effects can be computed using conformal perturbation theory.

== See also ==
- AdS/CFT correspondence
- Boundary conformal field theory
- Conformal algebra
- Conformal bootstrap
- Critical point
- History of conformal field theory
- Logarithmic conformal field theory
- Operator product expansion
- Primary field
- Superconformal algebra
