= Sum rules (quantum field theory) =

Relation between static and dynamic quantities

In quantum field theory, a sum rule is a relation between a static quantity and an integral over a dynamical quantity. Therefore, they have a form such as:

$\int A(x) dx = B$

where $A(x)$ is the dynamical quantity, for example a structure function characterizing a particle, and $B$ is the static quantity, for example the mass or the charge of that particle.

Quantum field theory sum rules should not be confused with sum rules in quantum chromodynamics or quantum mechanics.

== Properties ==
Many sum rules exist. The validity of a particular sum rule can be sound if its derivation is based on solid assumptions, or on the contrary, some sum rules have been shown experimentally to be incorrect, due to unwarranted assumptions made in their derivation. The list of sum rules below illustrate this.

Sum rules are usually obtained by combining a dispersion relation with the optical theorem, using the operator product expansion or current algebra.

Quantum field theory sum rules are useful in a variety of ways. They permit to test the theory used to derive them, e.g. quantum chromodynamics, or an assumption made for the derivation, e.g. Lorentz invariance. They can be used to study a particle, e.g. how does the spins of partons make up the spin of the proton. They can also be used as a measurement method. If the static quantity $B$ is difficult to measure directly, measuring $A(x)$ and integrating it offers a practical way to obtain $B$ (providing that the particular sum rule linking $A(x)$ to $B$ is reliable).

Although in principle, $B$ is a static quantity, the denomination of sum rule has been extended to the case where $B$ is a probability amplitude, e.g. the probability amplitude of Compton scattering, see the list of sum rules below.

== List of sum rules ==
(The list is not exhaustive)

- Adler sum rule. This sum rule relates the charged current structure function of the proton $F_2^{\nu p}(Q^2,x)$ (here, $x$ is the Bjorken scaling variable and $Q^2$ is the square of the absolute value of the four-momentum transferred between the scattering neutrino and the proton) to the Cabibbo angle $\theta_c$. It states that in the limit $Q^2 \to \infty$, then $\int_0^1 F_2^{\bar \nu p}(Q^2,x)-F_2^{ \nu p}(Q^2,x) \frac{dx}{x}= 2(1+\sin^2\theta_c)$. The $\bar \nu$ and $\nu$ superscripts indicate that $F_2$ relates to antineutrino-proton or neutrino-proton deep inelastic scattering, respectively.
- Adler-Weisberger sum rule. It relates the axial charge of the nucleon $g_A$ to pion-nucleon scattering quantities: $1+\frac{F_\pi^2}{2\pi}\int_0^\infty \big[\sigma_{\pi^+p}(E) - \sigma_{\pi^-p}(E) \big]\frac{dE}{E}=g_A^2$, where $F_\pi=92.4$ MeV is the pion decay constant, and $\sigma_{\pi^+p}$ and $\sigma_{\pi^-p}$ are the pion-proton scattering cross-sections for $\pi^+$ and $\pi^+$, respectively.
- Baldin sum rule. This is the unpolarized equivalent of the GDH sum rule (see below). It relates the probability that a photon absorbed by a particle results in the production of hadrons (this probability is called the photo-production cross-section) to the electric and magnetic polarizabilities of the absorbing particle. The sum rule reads $\int_{\nu_0}^\infty \sigma_{tot}/\nu^2 d\nu = 4\pi^2(\alpha+\beta)$, where $\nu$ is the photon energy, $\nu_0$ is minimum value of energy necessary to create the lightest hadron (i.e. a pion), $\sigma_{tot}$ is the photo-production cross-section, and $\alpha$ and $\beta$ are the particle electric and magnetic polarizabilities, respectively. Assuming its validity, the Baldin sum rule provides an important information on our knowledge of electric and magnetic polarizabilities, complementary to their direct calculations or measurements. (See e.g. Fig. 3 in the article.)
- Bass-Brodsky-Schmidt sum rule: The sum rule states that the integral of the spin-dependent structure function of a real photon, $g_1^{\gamma}(x,Q^2)$ vanishes for any value of the momentum transfer $Q^2$ the photon is probed with: $\int_0^1 g_1^{\gamma}(x,Q^2) dx= 0$. The relation is non-perturbative and holds for abelian and non-abelian gauge theories.
- Bjorken sum rule (polarized). This sum rule is the prototypical QCD spin sum rule. It states that in the Bjorken scaling domain, the integral of the spin structure function of the proton minus that of the neutron is proportional to the axial charge of the nucleon. Specifically: $\int_0^1 g_1^p(x)-g_1^n(x) dx= g_A/6$, where $x$ is the Bjorken scaling variable, $g_1^{p(n)}(x)$ is the first spin structure function of the proton (neutron), and $g_A$ is the nucleon axial charge that characterizes the neutron β-decay. Outside of the Bjorken scaling domain, the Bjorken sum rule acquires QCD scaling corrections that are known up to the 5th order in precision. The sum rule was experimentally verified within better than a 10% precision.
- Bjorken sum rule (unpolarized). The sum rule is, at leading order in perturbative QCD: $\int_0^1 F_1^{p\nu}(x,Q^2)-F_1^{p\bar{\nu}}(x,Q^2) dx= \int_0^1 F_1^{p\nu}(x,Q^2)-F_1^{n\nu}(x,Q^2) dx =1-\frac{2}{3}\frac{\alpha_s(Q^2)}{\pi},$ where $F_1^{p\nu}(x,Q^2),~F_1^{p\bar{\nu}}(x,Q^2)$ and $F_1^{n\nu}(x,Q^2)$ are the first structure functions for the proton-neutrino, proton-antineutrino and neutron-neutrino deep inelastic scattering reactions, $Q^2$ is the square of the 4-momentum exchanged between the nucleon and the (anti)neutrino in the reaction, and $\alpha_s$ is the QCD coupling.
- Burkhardt–Cottingham sum rule. The sum rule was experimentally verified. The sum rule is "superconvergent", meaning that its form is independent of $Q^2$. The sum rule is: $\int_0^1 g_2(x,Q^2) dx=0,~ \forall~Q^2$ where $g_2(x,Q^2)$ is the second spin structure function of the object studied.
- $\delta_{LT}$ sum rule.
- Close-Kumano sum rule. states that in the Bjorken limit $Q^2 \to \infty$ with $Q^2/\nu$ finite, the integral over the first tensor structure function of the deuteron, $b_1$, vanishes $\int_0^1 b_1^{\gamma}(x) dx= 0$.
- Efremov–Teryaev–Leader sum rule.
- Ellis–Jaffe sum rule. The sum rule was shown to not hold experimentally, suggesting that the strange quark spin contributes non-negligibly to the proton spin. The Ellis–Jaffe sum rule provides an example of how the violation of a sum rule teaches us about a fundamental property of matter (in this case, the origin of the proton spin).
- Forward spin polarizability sum rule.
- Fubini–Furlan–Rossetti Sum Rule.
- Gerasimov–Drell–Hearn sum rule (GDH, sometimes DHG sum rule). This is the polarized equivalent of the Baldin sum rule (see above). The sum rule is: $\int_{\nu_0}^\infty (2\sigma_{TT})/(\nu)d\nu = -4\pi^2\alpha\kappa^2S/m_t^2$, where $\nu_0$ is the minimal energy required to produce a pion once the photon is absorbed by the target particle, $\sigma_{TT}$ is the difference between the photon absorption cross-sections when the photons spin are aligned and anti-aligned with the target spin, $\nu$ is the photon energy, $\alpha$ is the fine-structure constant, and $\kappa$, $S$ and $m_t$ are the anomalous magnetic moment, spin quantum number and mass of the target particle, respectively. The derivation of the GDH sum rule assumes that the theory that governs the structure of the target particle (e.g. QCD for a nucleon or a nucleus) is causal (that is, one can use dispersion relations or equivalently for GDH, the Kramers–Kronig relations), unitary and Lorentz and gauge invariant. These three assumptions are very basic premises of Quantum Field Theory. Therefore, testing the GDH sum rule tests these fundamental premises. The GDH sum rule was experimentally verified (within a 10% precision).
- Generalized GDH sum rule. Several generalized versions of the GDH sum rule have been proposed. The first and most common one is: $\int_0^1 g_1(x,Q^2) dx = Q^2 S_1(0,Q^2)/8$, where $g_1$ is the first spin structure function of the target particle, $x$ is the Bjorken scaling variable, $Q^2$ is the virtuality of the photon or equivalently, the square of the absolute value of the four-momentum transferred between the beam particle that produced the virtual photon and the target particle, and $S_1(\nu,Q^2)$ is the first forward virtual Compton scattering amplitude. It can be argued that calling this relation sum rule is improper, since $S_1(\nu,Q^2)$ is not a static property of the target particle nor a directly measurable observable. Nonetheless, the denomination sum rule is widely used.
- Gottfried sum rule. The sum rule states that the integral weighted by $x$ of the unpolarized structure function $F_2(x,Q^2)$ of the proton minus that of the neutron is related to the flavor asymmetry of the sea quarks: $I_{G} = \int_0^1 F_2^{p}(x,Q^2)-F_2^{n}(x,Q^2) \frac{dx}{x}= \frac{1}{3} - \frac{2}{3}\int_0^1 \bar d(x,Q^2) - \bar u(x,Q^2)dx$. Assuming a flavor symmetric sea yields the Gottfried sum rule proper, $I_{G} = 1/3$, which has been ruled out by measurements, yielding the first clear evidence for flavor asymmetry in the nucleon sea.
- Gross–Llewellyn Smith sum rule. It states that in the Bjorken scaling domain, the integral of the $F_3(x)$ structure function of the nucleon is equal to the number of valence quarks composing the nucleon, i.e., equal to 3. Specifically: $\int_0^1 F_3(x) dx= 3$. Outside of the Bjorken scaling domain, the Gross–Llewellyn Smith sum rule acquires QCD scaling corrections that are identical to that of the Bjorken sum rule. The Gross–Llewellyn Smith integral was measured by the CCFR experiment at Fermilab.
- Momentum sum rule: It states that the sum of the momentum fraction $x$ of all the partons (quarks, antiquarks and gluons) inside a hadron is equal to 1.
- Ji Sum rule: Relates the integral of generalized parton distributions (GPD) to the total angular momentum carried by the quarks or by the gluons. It reads

$\frac{1}{2}\int_{-1}^1 x \big[E_{q,g}(x,0,0) + H_{q,g}(x,0,0) \big] dx = J_{q,g}$, where $J_{q,g}$ is the quark ($q$) or gluon ($g$) total angular momentum, $E_{q,g} (x,\xi,t)$ is the quark or gluon unpolarized helicity-conserving GDP and $H_{q,g} (x,\xi,t)$ is the quark or gluon unpolarized helicity-flip GDP. The kinematics variables skewness $\xi$ and Mandestam's $t$ are set to zero.

- Proton mass sum rule: It decomposes the proton mass in four terms, quark energy, quark mass, gluon energy and quantum anomalous energy, with each of these terms an integral over 3-dimensional coordinate space.
- Schwinger sum rule. The Schwinger sum rule is a theoretical result involving the scattering of polarized leptons off polarized target particles. It reads: $\frac{8M^2}{Q^2}\int_0^{x_0} g_1(x,Q^2)+g_2(x,Q^2) dx \to \kappa e \text{ as } Q^2 \to 0$, where $M$ is the mass of the target particle, $Q^2$ the square of the absolute value of the four-momentum transferred to the target particle during the scattering process, $x$ the Bjorken scaling variable, $x_0$ the $x$-value for the minimal energy required to produce a pion off the target particle, and $g_1(x,Q^2)$ and $g_2(x,Q^2)$ the first and second spin structure functions of the target particle, respectively. The limit is for $Q \to 0$, with $\kappa$ the anomalous magnetic moment of the target particle and $e$ its charge. The integrand of the sum rule can also be expressed with the $1/Q$-weighted transverse-longitudinal interference cross-section, $\sigma_{LT}/Q$. This makes it similar to the generalized GDH sum rule. Interestingly, the sum rule involves longitudinal photons that do not exist in the $Q \to 0$ limit, where the sum rule applies, since real photons have only transverse spin projections. Therefore, one expects $\sigma_{LT}=0$ in the limit $Q \to 0$. However, despite this, the integral over the ratio $\sigma_{LT}/Q$ is expected to be finite and non-zero in this limit, according to the sum rule. The sum rule was experimentally tested for the neutron, and although experimental uncertainties exist, it was found to hold, provided the GDH sum rule also holds.
- Wandzura–Wilczek sum rule.

== See also ==
- Quantum chromodynamics
- Proton spin crisis
