= Nuclear shadowing =

Phenomenon in nuclear and particle physics

Nuclear shadowing is an effect seen in high-energy physics where the internal structure of a nucleus appears suppressed -that is in classical terms, less dense- compared to what one would expect from simply adding up the contributions of individual, free nucleons (protons and neutrons). In technical terms, the cross sections of nucleons imbedded in a nucleus appears smaller compared to that of free nucleons. This happens because the particle used to probe the nucleus —usually a photon or gluon— can briefly transform into other particles that live long enough to interact coherently with several nucleons at once. These interactions destructively interfere with each other in a way that cancels out part of the effect, leading to a reduction in the measured cross section.

== The Gribov–Glauber shadowing mechanism ==
Shadowing was first observed in the 1960s, and by the late 1960s and early 1970s, nuclear shadowing had been observed in several reactions: photon–nucleus interactions (photoabsorption, photoproduction), hadron–nucleus interactions (e.g., π–A scattering, proton–A scattering), lepton pair (Drell–Yan) production.

These observations lead to a picture mostly for real or nearly real photons (i.e. their off-shell mass $Q^2$ is very low) that explained shadowing qualitatively and quantitatively. This picture, known as the Gribov–Glauber shadowing mechanism is based on two principal ingredients. (A) Vector meson dominance (VMD), i.e. the fluctuations of a photon into hadronic states and (B) coherent multiple scattering in the nucleus (Glauber theory).

In the VMD model, a high-energy photon spends part of its time as a vector meson (ρ, ω, φ), which then interacts hadronically with nucleons. The distance over which such fluctuation occurs (known as the coherence length) can be estimated with the uncertainty principle to be of the order of $l_c \approx \frac{1}{2m_N x}$, where $m_N$ is the meson mass and $x$ the Bjorken scaling variable.

Since $l_c$ is inversely proportional to $x$, $l_c$ may become larger than the nuclear radius at sufficiently small $x$. Then, the hadronic component of the photon will interact simultaneously with several nucleons of the nucleus. To picture this, it may help to think of $l_c$ as the size of wavefunction of the meson: large $l_c$ will spatially overlap over several nucleons, thereby interacting simultaneously with them. The photon can then interact with more than one nucleon coherently, which leads to destructive interference between the amplitudes for scattering off different nucleons. The net effect is that the total cross section per nucleon is reduced compared to the sum of incoherent scattering off free nucleons.

This model gave good quantitatively account of data in photoproduction of nuclei.

== Shadowing with highly virtual photons ==
The Gribov–Glauber shadowing mechanism was developed mostly for real photons or low-$Q^2$ photons (where $Q^2$ is the absolute value of off-shell mass mass of the photon, i.e. minus its squared four-momentum).

Before the physicists of CERN's EMC experiment did deeply inelastic scattering (DIS) off nuclei, it was not clear if shadowing would be seen in DIS. This was because DIS occurs at large $Q^2$ (i.e. very virtual photon with large $Q^2$). In fact, because the four-momenta characterizing nuclear binding and nuclear distances are much less (MeV scale) than that of DIS (GeV scale), most particle physicists expected nuclear shadowing to vanish away at large Q^2. In Feynman’s parton model language, at large $Q^2$, each parton is struck individually because the probe space-time resolution goes as $1/Q^2$, and furthermore, each parton is almost not interacting with its neighbors because the strong force coupling $\alpha_s$ becomes very small at large $Q^2$. Thus, the multiple scattering/coherence picture was expected to be less relevant in the DIS.

It was therefore a surprise that shadowing was observed in the EMC DIS nuclear data at very low-$x$. It was an even bigger surprise that another opposite nuclear effect, an enhancement of the structure function, (therefore called antishadowing) was also observed at more moderate $x$, as well as another enhancement at the largest $x$ due to nuclear Fermi motion. These effects form what is now known as the EMC effect.

The modern interpretation of nuclear shadowing in DIS at small $x$ is very similar to Gribov’s and Glauber’s ideas, but is usually stated in partonic language: the incoming virtual photon (with large coherence length $l_c$ at small $x$) can fluctuate into a quark–antiquark pair (or more complex hadronic states). These states interact coherently with several nucleons, which leads to destructive interference and suppression of the nuclear structure functions compared to the sum of free nucleons. In Quantum chromodynamics language: at small $x$, gluon densities become large, and the virtual photon can interact via partonic configurations that overlap spatially over several nucleons. This leads to shadowing of parton distributions: the nuclear parton distribution functions (PDFs) become suppressed compared to the sum of nucleon PDFs.
