= Transverse momentum distributions =

Distribution used in collider collisions

In high energy particle physics, specifically in hadron-beam scattering experiments, transverse momentum distributions (TMDs) are the distributions of the hadron's quark or gluon momenta that are perpendicular to the momentum transfer between the beam and the hadron. Specifically, they are probability distributions to find inside the hadron a parton with a transverse momentum $k_T$ and longitudinal momentum fraction $x$. TMDs provide information on the confined motion of quarks and gluons inside the hadron and complement the information on the hadron structure provided by parton distribution functions (PDFs) and generalized parton distributions (GPDs). In all, TMDs and PDFs provide the information of the momentum distribution (transverse and longitudinal, respectively) of the quarks (or gluons), and the GPDs, the information on their spatial distribution.

== Description, interpretation and usefulness ==
TMDs are an extension of the concept of parton distribution functions (PDFs) and structure functions that are measured in deep inelastic scattering (DIS). Some TMDs provide the $k_T$ dependence of the probabilities that the PDFs represent and that give rise to the DIS structure functions, namely the quark momentum probability distribution $f^q_1(x)$ for the unpolarized structure function $F_1(x)$ and the quark spin probability distribution $g^q_1(x)$ for the polarized structure functions $g_1(x)$. Here, $x$ denotes the fraction of hadron longitudinal momentum carried by the parton, and identifies with the Bjorken scaling variable in the infinite energy-momentum limit. The $f^q_1(x)$ and $g^q_1(x)$ PDFs are summed over all the $k_T$ values, and therefore, the $k_T$-dependence of the probabilities is integrated out. TMDs provides the unintegrated probabilities, with their $k_T$-dependence. Other TMDs exist that are not directly connected to $f^q_1(x)$ and $g^q_1(x)$. In all, there are 16 dominant (viz leading-twist) independent TMDs, 8 for the quarks and 8 for the gluons.

TMDs are, in particular, sensitive to correlations between the transverse momentum of partons in the parent hadron and their spin or the hadron spin. In turn, the correlations provide access to the dynamics of partons in the transverse plane in momentum space. Thus, TMDs are comparable and directly complementary to the generalized parton distributions (GPDs) which describe the parton dynamics in the transverse plane in position space. Formally, TMDs access the correlations between a parton orbital angular momentum (OAM) and the hadron/parton spin because they require wave function components with nonzero OAM. Therefore, TMDs allow us to study the full three-dimensional dynamics of hadrons, providing more detailed information than that contained in conventional PDF.

One example of the importance of TMDs is that they provide information about the quark and gluon OAM. Those are not directly accessible in regular DIS, but are crucial to understand the spin content of the nucleon and resolve the nucleon spin crisis. In fact, lattice QCD calculations indicate that quark OAM is the dominant contribution to the nucleon spin.

== Gluon TMDs ==
Similarly to quark TMDs, gluon TMDs allow access to the gluonic orbital angular momentum, another possibly important contribution to the nucleon spin. Just as there are eight TMDs for quarks, there are eight gluon TMDs. Gluon TMDs were first proposed in 2001.

== Examples of TMDs ==
- The first and simplest example of quark TMD is $f_1^q(x,k_T)$. It arises when an unpolarized beam scatters off an unpolarized target hadron, and therefore does not carry quark/hadron spin information. The function $f_1^q(x,k_T)$ provides the probability that a beam particle strikes a target quark of momentum fraction $x$ and transverse momentum $k_T$. It is related to the traditional DIS PDF $f_1^q(x)$ by $\int d^2k_T~f_1^q(x,k_T)=f_1^q(x)$.
- Similarly to $f_1^q(x,k_T)$, we have the $g_{1l}^q(x,k_T)$ and $h_1^q(x,k_T)$ TMDs, whose integrals are, respectively, $g_1^q(x)$ and the quark transversity distribution.

In addition to the three above TMDs which are direct extension of the DIS PDFs, there are five other quark TMDs which depend not only on the magnitude of $k_T$, but also on its direction. Therefore these TMDs vanish if simply integrated over $k_T$, and do not directly connect to DIS PDFs. They are:

- The Sivers distribution $f_{1T}^{\bot,q}$ which expresses, in a transversely polarized hadron, the asymmetric distribution of the quark transverse momentum around the center of the $p_x$ and $p_y$ plane. The azimuthally asymmetric quark distribution in the transverse momentum space is often called the “Sivers effect’’. In semi-inclusive DIS (SIDIS) in which a leading hadron is detected in addition to the scattered lepton, $f_{1T}^{\bot,q}$ stems from gluon exchanges between the struck quark and the target remnants (final state interaction). In contrast, in the Drell–Yan process, $f_{1T}^{\bot,q}$ stems from ‘’initial’’ state interaction. This leads to $f_{1T}^{\bot,q}$ having opposite signs in the two processes (T-odd functions).
- The Boer–Mulders function $h_{1}^{\bot,q}(x,k_T)$ characterizes the distribution of transversely polarized quarks in an unpolarized hadron. It is also a T-odd function, like $f_{1T}^{\bot,q}$.
- The $h_{1T}^{\bot,q}(x,k_T)$, $g_{1T}^{\bot,q}(x,k_T)$ and $h_{1L}^{\bot,q}(x,k_T)$ functions.

== Measurements ==
Our initial understanding of the short-distance nucleon structure has come from deep inelastic scattering (DIS) experiments. This description is essentially one-dimensional: DIS provides us with the parton momentum distributions in term of the single variable x, which is interpreted in the infinite momentum limit (the Bjorken limit) as the fraction of the nucleon momentum carried by the struck partons. Therefore, from DIS we only learn about the relative longitudinal momentum distribution of the partons, i.e. their longitudinal motions inside the nucleon.

The measurement of TMDs allows to go beyond this one-dimensional picture. This entails that to measure TMDs, we need to gather more information from the scattering process. In DIS, only the scattered lepton is detected while the remnants of the shattered nucleon are ignored (inclusive experiment). Semi-inclusive DIS (SIDIS), where a high momentum (i.e. leading) hadron is detected in addition of the scattered lepton, allows us to obtain the needed additional details about the scattering process kinematics. The detected hadron results from the hadronization of the struck quark. This latter retains the information on its motion inside the nucleon, including its transverse momentum $k_T$ which allows to access the TMDs. In addition of its initial intrinsic transverse momentum $k_T$ the struck quark also acquires a transverse momentum $p_T$ during the hadronization process. Consequently, the structure functions entering the SIDIS cross-section or asymmetries are convolutions of a $k_T$-dependent quark density, the TMD itself, and of a $p_T$-dependent fragmentation function. Therefore, precise knowledge of fragmentation functions is important to extract TMDs from experimental results.

Other reactions than SIDIS can be used to access TMDs, such as the Drell–Yan process.

Quark TMDs measurements were pioneered at DESY by the HERMES experiment. They are currently (2021) being measured at CERN by the COMPASS experiment and several experiments at Jefferson Lab. Quark and gluon TDM measurements are an important part of the future electron–ion collider scientific program.
