= James Bjorken =

American physicist (1934–2024)

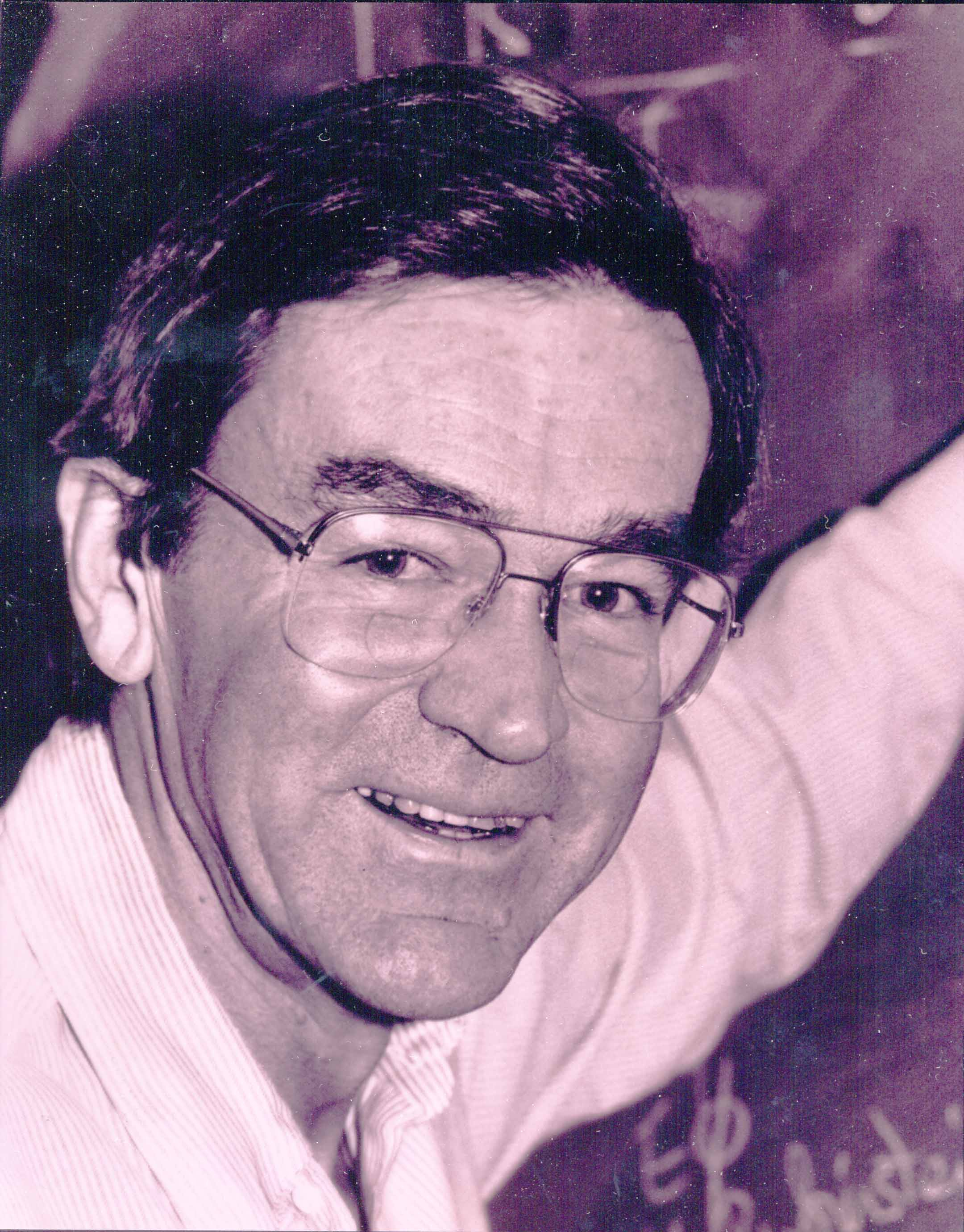
- Born: James Daniel Bjorken; June 22, 1934; Chicago, Illinois, U.S.
- Died: August 6, 2024 (aged 90); Redwood City, California, U.S.
- Education: Massachusetts Institute of Technology (BS); Stanford University (PhD)
- Known for: Bjorken scaling Intrabeam scattering Jet quenching Co-predicting the charm quark
- Spouse: Joan Goldthwaite (m. 1967; died 1983)
- Children: 2
- Awards: Putnam Fellow (1954); Heineman Prize (1972); E. O. Lawrence Award (1977); Pomeranchuk Prize (2000); ICTP Dirac Medal (2004); Wolf Prize in Physics (2015); EPS High Energy and Particle Physics Prize (2015)
- Scientific career
- Fields: Theoretical physics
- Workplaces: Fermilab, SLAC
- Thesis: Experimental tests of Quantum electrodynamics and spectral representations of Green's functions in perturbation theory (1959)
- Doctoral advisor: Sidney Drell
- Doctoral students: John Kogut; Davison Soper; Helen Quinn

James Daniel "BJ" Bjorken (June 22, 1934 – August 6, 2024) was an American theoretical physicist. He was a Putnam Fellow in 1954, received a BS in physics from MIT in 1956, and obtained his PhD from Stanford University in 1959. Bjorken was a visiting scholar at the Institute for Advanced Study in the fall of 1962. He was also emeritus professor in the SLAC Theory Group at the Stanford Linear Accelerator Center, and was a member of the Theory Department of the Fermi National Accelerator Laboratory (1979–1989).

Bjorken was awarded the Dirac Medal of the ICTP in 2004; and, in 2015, the Wolf Prize in Physics and the EPS High Energy and Particle Physics Prize.

== Early life and education ==
James Bjorken's father, J. Daniel Bjorken, was an immigrant from Sweden near Lake Siljan. He changed his surname from "Björkén" to Bjorken upon arriving in the US; he moved to Chicago to work as an electrical engineer, which was where he met his future wife, Edith. James Bjorken grew up in Chicago and enjoyed mathematics, chemistry, the French horn, and watching the Chicago Cubs play at Wrigley Field. After graduating from Maine East High School in 1952, he decided to attend Massachusetts Institute of Technology (MIT) over the University of Chicago. Despite being offered more financial aid to attend the University of Chicago, his parents advised him that he should move further away to find his independence.

At MIT, he quickly decided to major in physics; one of the main reasons was his enjoyment of the lectures that Hans Mueller gave. Another of his influences at MIT was Sidney Drell, who became his mentor. After graduating in 1956, he attended Stanford University, graduating with his PhD in 1959 and staying on as a postdoctoral researcher for several years.

== Work ==
Bjorken discovered in 1968 what is known as light-cone scaling (or Bjorken scaling), a phenomenon in the deep inelastic scattering of light on strongly interacting particles, known as hadrons (such as protons and neutrons): Experimentally observed hadrons behave as collections of virtually independent point-like constituents when probed at high energies.

Properties of these hadrons scale, that is, they are determined not by the absolute energy of an experiment, but, instead, by dimensionless kinematic quantities, such as a scattering angle or the ratio of the energy to a momentum transfer. Because increasing energy implies potentially improved spatial resolution, scaling implies independence of the absolute resolution scale, and hence effectively point-like substructure.

This observation was critical to the recognition of quarks as actual elementary particles (rather than just convenient theoretical constructs), and led to the theory of strong interactions known as quantum chromodynamics, where it was understood in terms of the asymptotic freedom property. In Bjorken's picture, the quarks become point-like, observable objects at very short distances (high energies), shorter than the size of the hadrons.

Bjorken also discovered the Bjorken sum rule, the prototypical QCD spin sum rule. It states that in the Bjorken scaling domain, the integral of the spin structure function of the proton minus that of the neutron is proportional to the axial charge of the nucleon. Specially: $\int_0^1 dx (g_1^p(x)-g_1^n(x)) = g_A/6$, where $x$ is the Bjorken scaling variable, $g_1^{p(n)}(x)$ is the first spin structure function of the proton (neutron), and $g_A$ is the nucleon axial charge that characterizes the neutron β-decay. The sum rule was experimentally verified within better than a 10% precision.

Bjorken was also among the first to point out the phenomena of jet quenching in heavy ion collisions in 1982.

Richard Feynman subsequently reformulated this concept into the parton model, used to understand the quark composition of hadrons at high energies. The predictions of Bjorken scaling were confirmed in the early late 1960s electroproduction experiments at SLAC, in which quarks were seen for the first time. The general idea, with small logarithmic modifications, is explained in quantum chromodynamics by "asymptotic freedom".

Bjorken co-authored, with Sidney Drell, a classic companion volume textbook on relativistic quantum mechanics and quantum fields.

== Personal life and death ==
In 1967, Bjorken married Joan Goldthwaite; they had two children and were married until her death in 1983. He lived in Sky Londa, California.

Bjorken died from melanoma at a care facility in Redwood City, California, on August 6, 2024 at the age of 90.

== Publications ==
=== Books ===
- J.D. Bjorken, S. Drell (1964). Relativistic Quantum Mechanics. McGraw-Hill. ISBN 0-07-005493-2.
- J.D. Bjorken, S. Drell (1965). Relativistic Quantum Fields. McGraw-Hill. ISBN 0-07-005494-0.

=== Selected papers ===
- J. D. Bjorken (1968). "Current Algebra at Small Distances", in Proceedings of the International School of Physics Enrico Fermi Course XLI, J. Steinberger, ed., Academic Press, New York, pp. 55–81. Online, SLAC-PUB-338
- J.D. Bjorken (1969). "Asymptotic Sum Rules at Infinite Momentum" (PDF). Physical Review. 179 (5): 1547–1553. Bibcode:1969PhRv..179.1547B. doi:10.1103/PhysRev.179.1547. OSTI 1444603.
- J.D. Bjorken (1982). "Energy Loss of Energetic Partons in Quark-Gluon Plasma: Possible Excitation of High pT Jets in Hadron-Hadron Collisions". FERMILAB-Pub-82/59-THY.

=== Full list of papers ===
INSPIRE-HEP -- Bjorken
