= Fermilab E-906/SeaQuest =

Particle physics experiment

SeaQuest
- FNAL E-906
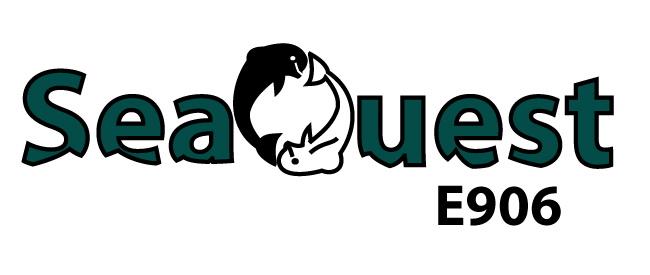
- Tentative collaboration logo

Experiment Information
- Location: Fermilab, NM4 Bldg.
- Type: Fixed Target Drell–Yan
- Targets: Liquid Deuterium, liquid Hydrogen, solid Carbon, solid Iron, solid Tungsten
- Beam Energy: 120 GeV
- Physics Goal: To measure the asymmetry of up and down antiquarks in the nucleon sea using Drell–Yan dimuons
- Spokespersons: Paul E. Reimer and Don F. Geesaman

Fermilab E-906/SeaQuest is a particle physics experiment which will use Drell–Yan process to measure the contributions of antiquarks to the structure of the proton or neutron and how this structure is modified when the proton or neutron is included within an atomic nucleus.

== Overview ==
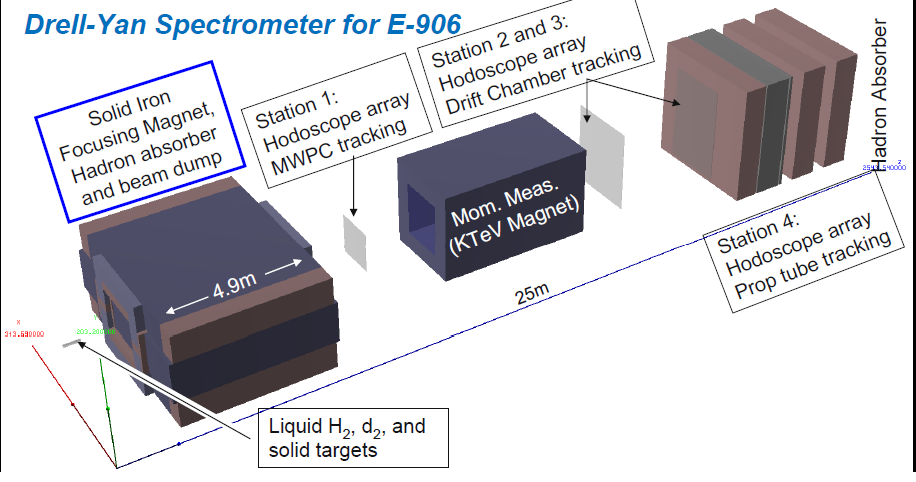
E-906 Spectrometer Image

The Fermilab E-906/SeaQuest experiment is part of a series of fixed target Drell–Yan experiments designed to measure the quark and antiquark structure of the nucleon and the modifications to that structure. With these measurements, SeaQuest will also be able to quantify the energy loss of a colored parton (quark) travelling through cold, strongly-interacting matter.

SeaQuest has been approved by Fermilab to extend previous down to up antiquark measurements to larger Bjorken x. It will use a 120 GeV proton beam extracted from the Fermilab Main Injector. The experiment will also examine the modifications to the antiquark structure of the proton from nuclear binding.

== Physics motivations ==
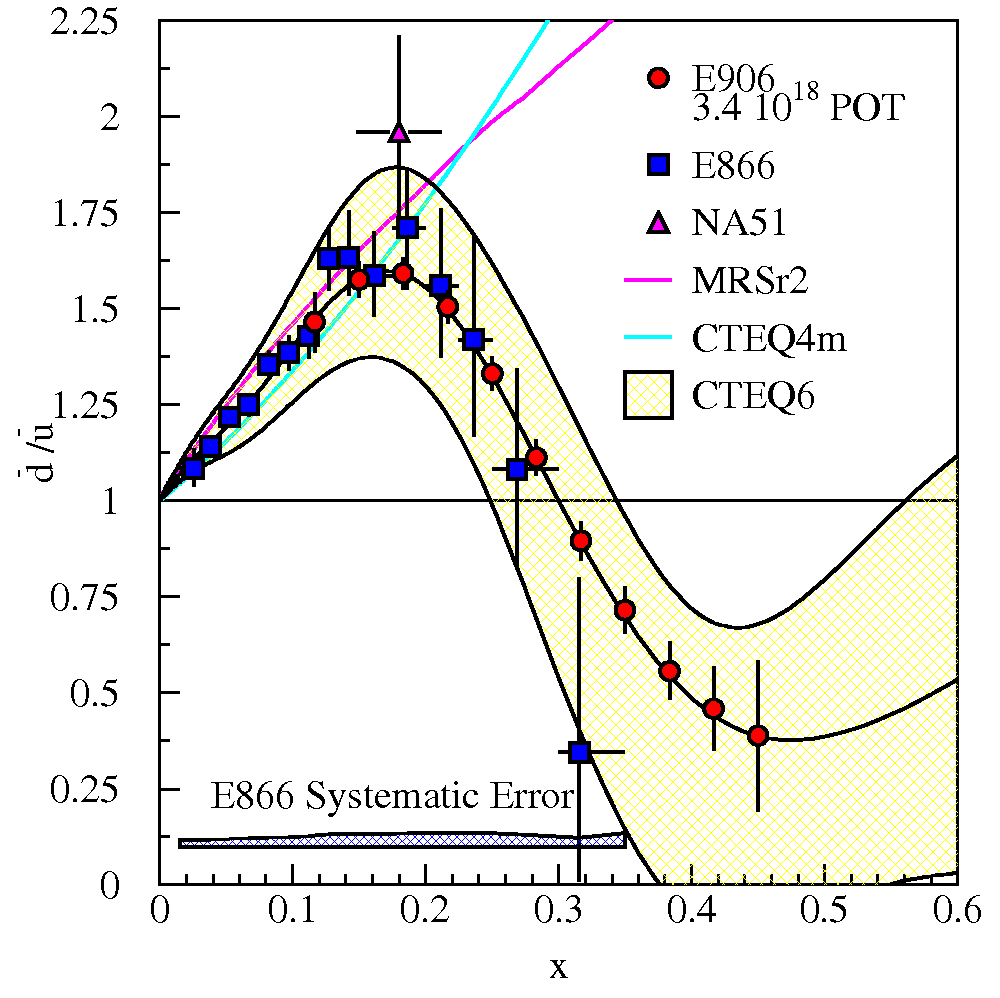
SeaQuest expected uncertainties for extending to higher Bjorken x

=== d̅/u̅ asymmetry ===
Originally it was thought down and up antiquarks (d̅ and u̅, respectively) were produced in the nucleon sea with a ratio of 1. However, the result of deep inelastic scattering experiment by CERN-NMC showed that there are more d̅'s than u̅'s in the proton. The Gottfried sum evaluated by NMC from the data of deep inelastic muon scattering on a proton and a deuteron targets was 0.235±0.026 which is smaller than the expected value of 0.333. This means that d̅(x)-u̅(x) integrated over Bjorken x from 0 to 1.0 is 0.147±0.039, indicating a flavor asymmetry in the proton sea. In the early 1990s, DYSSIS (CERN-NA51) made a measurement of Drell–Yan process in the low Bjorken x region that tilted the ratio in favor of a higher d̅ number than u̅. Experiments such as Fermilab E-866/NuSea yielded results in a range of low Bjorken x, which further showed an asymmetry in the antiquark production. SeaQuest will extend the measurements to higher Bjorken x, which will help resolve questions about the behavior of this ratio above x ≈ 0.3.

=== Partons in cold nuclear matter ===
The Drell–Yan process is particularly well-suited to carry out a measurement of energy loss of quarks as they propagate through nuclear matter. Since the products—a virtual photon and two leptons—do not interact strongly with the rest of the nuclear medium, there is no further loss of energy due to QCD bremsstrahlung.

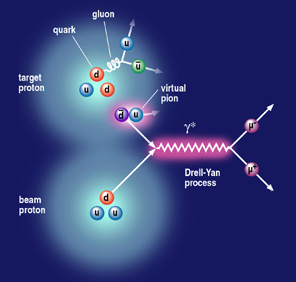
Feynman diagram of the Drell–Yan process

=== Antishadowing and the EMC effect ===
In studying a free nucleon and a nucleon bound in a nucleus, the European Muon Collaboration found that nucleons inside a nucleus have a different distribution of momentum among their component quarks. Three main features are the shadowing, antishadowing, and the "EMC effect". A previous Drell–Yan experiment (Fermilab E-772) has studied this with inconclusive results in the antishadowing region and with no results in the "EMC effect" region. SeaQuest will be able to yield more statistically precise results regarding the antishadowing region, and will be able to probe into the "EMC effect" region, where no Drell–Yan data has yet been seen.

== Collaboration ==
- Abilene Christian University
- Academia Sinica
- Argonne National Laboratory
- University of Colorado
- Fermi National Accelerator Laboratory
- University of Illinois
- KEK
- Los Alamos National Laboratory
- University of Maryland
- University of Michigan
- National Kaohsiung Normal University
- RIKEN
- Rutgers University
- Tokyo Institute of Technology
- Yamagata University
