= CDHS experiment =

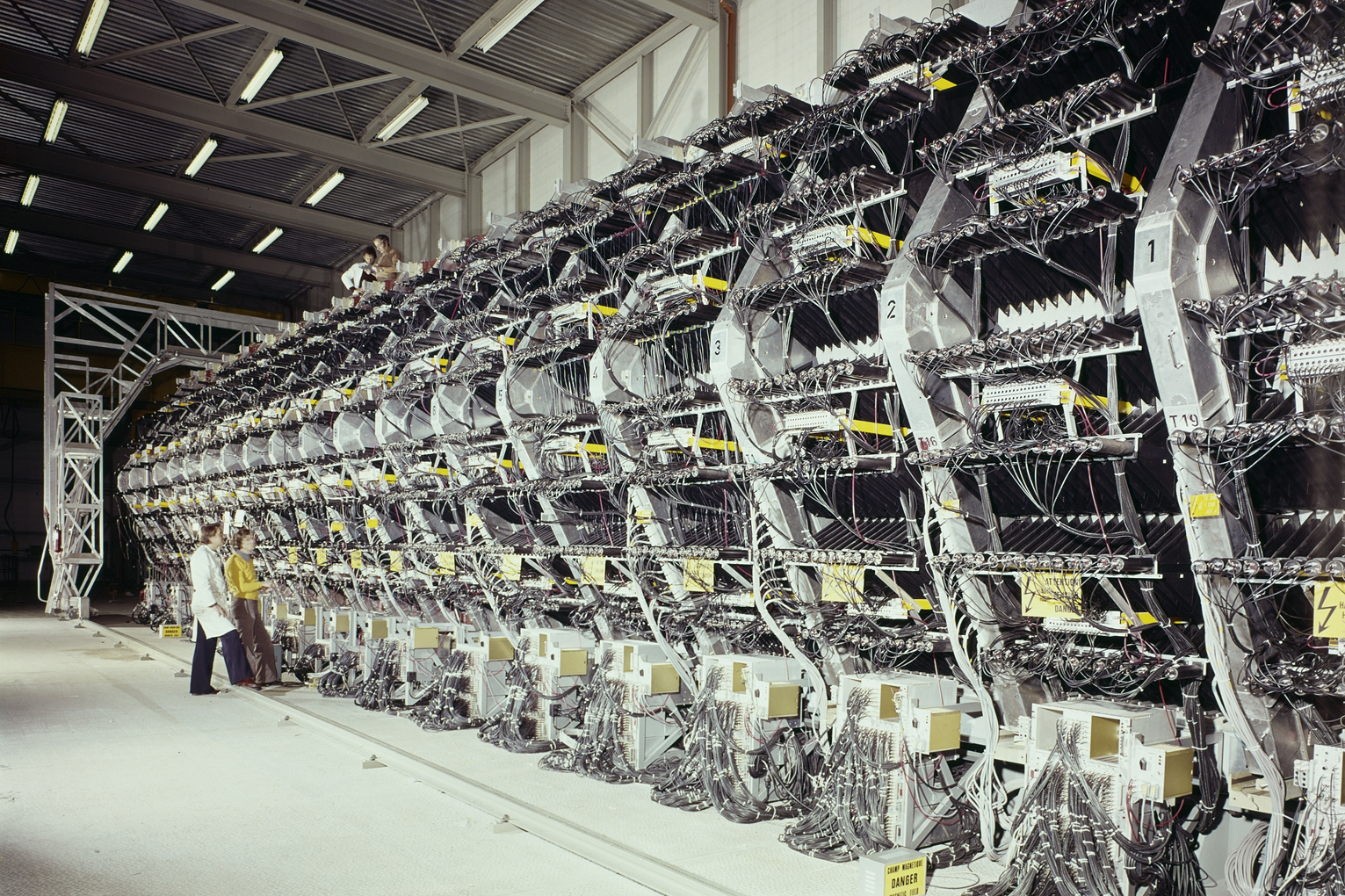
The CDHS (WA1) experimental setup at CERN

CDHS was a neutrino experiment at CERN taking data from 1976 until 1984. The experiment was officially referred to as WA1. CDHS was a collaboration of groups from CERN, Dortmund, Heidelberg, Saclay and later Warsaw. The collaboration was led by Jack Steinberger. The experiment was designed to study deep inelastic neutrino interactions in iron.

== Experimental setup ==
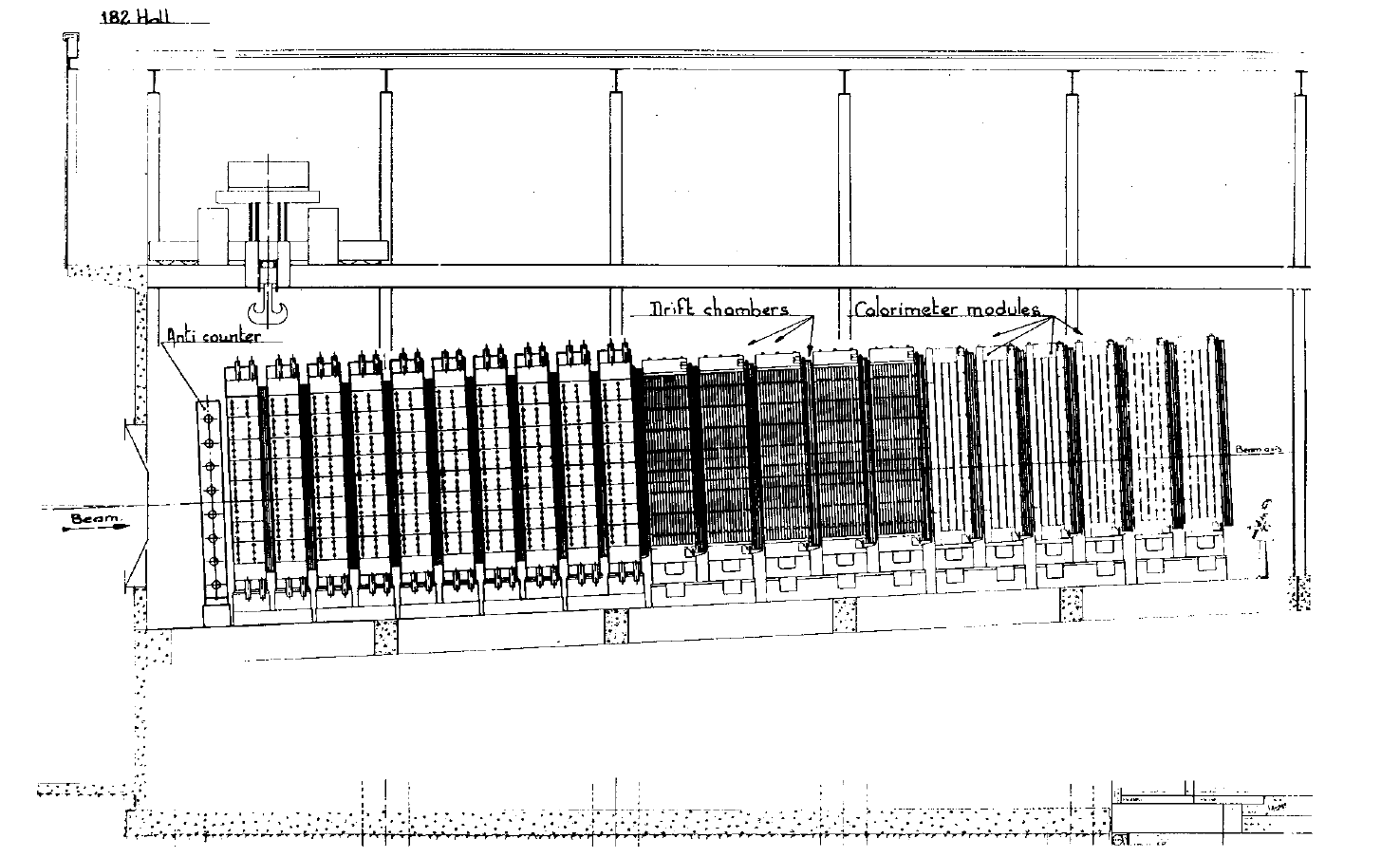
Technical sketch of the upgraded CDHS detector

The core of the detector consisted of 19 (later 20) magnetized iron modules. In the spacings between these, drift chambers for track reconstruction were installed. Additionally, plastic scintillators were inserted into the iron. Each iron module therefore served successively as an interaction target, where the neutrinos hit and produced hadron showers, a calorimeter that measured those hadrons' energy and a spectrometer, determining the momenta of produced muons via magnetic deflection.

At the time of its completion in 1976, the overall detector was 20 m long and weighed approximately 1250 tons.

The experiment was located in CERN's West Area, in building 182. The neutrinos (and antineutrinos) were produced by protons from the Super Proton Synchrotron (SPS) at energies of around 400 GeV, which were shot onto a beryllium target.

== History ==
The experiment was first proposed in July 1973 by a group led by Jack Steinberger as a two-piece detector. The front should serve as the neutrino target and hadronic shower detector, the following second part should detect the muon traces. It was planned that the four proposing groups from Saclay, Dortmund, Heidelberg and CERN would contribute with complementary expertise and manpower. For example, Saclay was assigned to be in charge of the drift chambers, whereas CERN should handle the iron core magnets. It were also these four groups that gave the experiment its name: CERN Dortmund Heidelberg Saclay (CDHS). Approximately 30 people should form the final experiment group.

After prolonged discussions with the SPS Committee, that was in charge of approving the proposals and distributing available money, an updated proposal for the new detector was submitted in March 1974. The suggested detector was a modular setup consisting of magnetized iron modules in combination with drift chambers and plastic scintillators. This new proposal was approved by the committee in April 1974. Construction started soon after and was completed in 1976. The experiment's official name was WA1, since it was the first approved experiment at CERN's West Area. The estimated cost of the detector ranged between 6 and 8 million CHF.

In 1979, an upgrade of the experimental setup was proposed. The main reason for this upgrade was the comparably low resolution of eight of the 19 detector modules. This situation should be improved by inserting twelve new and better modules, resulting in a slightly longer and significantly more accurate machine. The proposal also included the suggestion for a group from Warsaw University, led by Adam Para, to join the project. Starting with the long shutdown of the Super Proton Synchrotron (SPS) from summer 1980 on, the requested changes were implemented. Eventually, half of the experiment's target calorimeters got replaced and the total number of detector modules was increased from 19 to 20. This led to four times higher spatial resolution of the produced particles as well as 25% more accurate measurements of the deposited hadronic energy. Additionally, four new drift chambers were installed, improving the reconstruction of muon tracks. Later, a liquid hydrogen tank was added in front of the detector as a target to measure the structure function of protons.

CDHS took data with neutrinos delivered by the SPS from late 1976 until September 1984.

== Results and discoveries ==
The scientific goal of the CDHS experiment was to study high energy neutrino interactions. When the incoming neutrinos (or antineutrinos) were interacting with the target iron, either charged current (ν + Fe → μ^{+} + anything) or neutral current (ν + Fe → ν + anything) events could be produced.

One of the main objectives of the experiment was to determine the ratio between the neutral and the charged inclusive neutrino cross sections, from which the Weinberg angle could be inferred. Neutral currents had previously been discovered by the Gargamelle experiment, which had also provided first estimates of the Weinberg angle. The results were confirmed and measured with much higher precision by CDHS, allowing to predict the mass of the top quark, before it was discovered at the Tevatron, with approximately ±40 GeV precision.

Other measurements regarding the electroweak interaction within the Standard Model included the measurement of more than one muon; i.e. dimuon and trimuon events.

Results obtained at CDHS provided experimental validation of the Standard Model, at a time when this model was still in the testing phase. An important step in this regard was the falsification of the alleged "high-y anomaly". The value y characterizes the inelasticity of neutrino collisions, i.e. it measures the amount of energy that an incoming neutrino transfers to the hadrons during their collision. Experiments at Fermilab had found the so-called "high-y anomaly", which challenged the Standard Model. However, results from CDHS disproved those findings, strengthening the Standard Model.

CDHS examined the nucleon structure functions, which enabled scientists to confirm the theory of quantum chromodynamics (QCD). This work included the determination of the QCD coupling constant $\alpha_\text{s}$, verification of the quark's (s = 1/2) and gluon's (s = 1) spin, as well as the falsification of both abelian theories of strong interactions and theories based on scalar gluons. Additionally, the experiments provided insights into the structure of the nucleon, examining the distribution of gluons, quarks and antiquarks within it. Results from CDHS were in line with the quark parton model, that assigned quarks to be point-like partons. In this context, it was also confirmed that the number of valence quarks in a nucleon is 3. Finally, the CDHS results allowed to determine the momentum distribution of strange quarks and antiquarks within a nucleon.

During its last years of operation, the CDHS collaboration engaged in the search for neutrino oscillations. Although this phenomenon could not be confirmed using CERN's large energy neutrino beam, this attempt influenced the following experiments that eventually discovered neutrino oscillations.
