= Christopher Sachrajda =

British physicist (born 1949)

- Born: 15 November 1949 (age 76)
- Education: University of Sussex (BSc); Imperial College London (DPhil)
- Awards: FRS (1996)
- Scientific career
- Fields: Lattice field theory; Quantum flavordynamics; The Standard Model
- Workplaces: SLAC; CERN; University of Southampton
- Thesis: Applications of perturbation theory to the high energy scattering of elementary particles. (1975)

Christopher Tadeusz Czeslaw Sachrajda FRS (born 15 November 1949) is a British physicist. He is a professor of physics at the University of Southampton since 1990.

== Education ==
Sachrajda earned his doctorate from Imperial College London in 1974. His thesis was entitled Applications of perturbation theory to the high energy scattering of elementary particles.

== Research ==
Sachrajda has made contributions to the development of quantum chromodynamics (QCD), the theory of the strong interactions. His work on the factorisation of mass singularities led to the perturbative prediction of many physical quantities in strong interaction physics. With others, he pioneered the calculation of higher-order corrections to deep inelastic structure functions, which has led to detailed tests of QCD and the determination of the momentum distribution of quarks and gluons inside the proton. He has played a leading role in the development of the lattice formulation of QCD into a quantitative non-perturbative technique and in the use of this formulation to compute, from first principles, a number of physical quantities, including deep inelastic structure functions, electromagnetic form factors of hadrons and semi-leptonic decays of charmed mesons.

== Awards and honours ==
Sachrajda was elected a Fellow of the Royal Society (FRS) in 1996.
