= Sum rule =

Sum rule may refer to:

- Sum rule in differentiation, Differentiation rules #Differentiation is linear
- Sum rule in integration, see Integral #Properties
- Addition principle, a counting principle in combinatorics
- In probability theory, an implication of the additivity axiom, see Probability axioms #Further consequences
- Sum rule in quantum mechanics
- QCD sum rules, non-perturbative techniques in quantum chromodynamics
- Sum rules (quantum field theory), relations between static and dynamic quantities in quantum field theory
