= Semi-inclusive deep inelastic scattering =

Variation of deep inelastic scattering

Feynman diagram representing deep inelastic scattering of a lepton (l) on a hadron (h), at leading order in perturbative expansion. The virtual photon (γ^{*}) knocks a quark (q) out of the hadron.

In high energy particle physics nucleon-lepton scattering, the semi-inclusive deep inelastic scattering (SIDIS) is a method to obtain information on the nucleon structure. It expands the traditional method of deep inelastic scattering (DIS). In DIS, only the scattered lepton is detected while the remnants of the shattered nucleon are ignored (inclusive experiment). In SIDIS, a high momentum hadron, a.k.a. the leading hadron is detected in addition to the scattered lepton. This yields additional details about the scattering process kinematics.

== Usefulness ==
The leading hadron results from the hadronization of the struck quark. This latter retains the information on its motion inside the nucleon, including its transverse momentum which allows to access the transverse momentum distributions (TMDs) of partons.

Likewise, by detecting the leading hadron, one essentially tags (i.e. identifies) the quark on which the scattering occurred. For example, if the leading hadron is a kaon, we know that the scattering occurred on one of the strange quarks of the nucleon's quark sea. In DIS the struck quark is not identified and the information is an indistinguishable sum over all the quark flavors. SIDIS allows to disentangle this information.

== Experiments ==
SIDIS measurements were pioneered at DESY by the HERMES experiment. They are currently (2021) being carried out at CERN by the COMPASS experiment and several experiments at Jefferson Lab. SIDIS will be an important technique used in the future Electron Ion Collider scientific program.
