= EMC effect =

Phenomenon in deep inelastic scattering

The EMC effect is the surprising observation that the cross section for deep inelastic scattering from an atomic nucleus is different from that of the same number of free protons and neutrons (collectively referred to as nucleons). From this observation, it can be inferred that the quark momentum distributions in nucleons bound inside nuclei are different from those of free nucleons. This effect was first observed in 1983 at CERN by the European Muon Collaboration, hence the name "EMC effect". It was unexpected, since the average binding energy of protons and neutrons inside nuclei is insignificant when compared to the energy transferred in deep inelastic scattering reactions that probe quark distributions. While over 1000 scientific papers have been written on the topic and numerous hypotheses have been proposed, no definitive explanation for the cause of the effect has been confirmed. Determining the origin of the EMC effect is one of the major unsolved problems in the field of nuclear physics.

== Background ==
Protons and neutrons, collectively referred to as nucleons, are the constituents of atomic nuclei, and nuclear matter such as that in neutron stars. Protons and neutrons themselves are composite particles made up of quarks and gluons, a discovery made at SLAC in the late 1960s using deep inelastic scattering (DIS) experiments (1990 Nobel Prize).

In the DIS reaction, a probe (typically an accelerated electron) scatters from an individual quark inside a nucleon. By measuring the cross section of the DIS process, the distribution of quarks inside the nucleon can be determined. These distributions are effectively functions of a single variable, known as Bjorken-x, which is a measure of the fraction of the nucleon's momentum carried by the struck quark (within the Breit frame).

Experiments using DIS from protons by electrons and other probes have allowed physicists to measure the proton's quark distribution over a wide range of Bjorken-x, i.e. the probability of finding a quark with momentum fraction x in the proton. Experiments using deuterium and helium-3 targets have similarly allowed physicists to determine the quark distribution of the neutron.

== Experimental history ==
Fig 1. The original figure from the paper by the EMC Collaboration. In the absence of the EMC effect, the data would not have a falling slope as a function of Bjorken-x. In more recent experiments, the ratio was below 1 for x ≲ 0.08

Fig 2: Another figure from the original EMC paper, showing predictions for the scaled DIS cross section ratio based on Fermi effects. These predictions do not match the experimental data.

In 1983, the European Muon Collaboration published results from an experiment conducted at CERN in which the DIS reaction was measured for high-energy muon scattering from iron and deuterium targets. It was expected that the cross section for DIS from iron divided by that from deuterium, and scaled by a factor of 28 (the iron-56 nucleus has 28 times more nucleons than deuterium) would be approximately 1. Instead, the data (Fig. 1) showed a decreasing slope in the region of 0.3 < x < 0.7 , reaching a minimum of 0.85 at the largest values of x .

This decreasing slope is a hallmark of the EMC effect. The slope of this cross section ratio between 0.3 < x < 0.7 is often referred to as the "size of the EMC effect" for a given nucleus.

Since that landmark discovery, the EMC effect has been measured over a wide range of nuclei, at several different laboratories, and with multiple different probes. Notable examples include:

- The E139 experiment at SLAC, which measured the EMC effect in natural helium, beryllium, carbon, aluminium, calcium, iron, silver, and gold, and found that the EMC effect increases with nuclear size.
- The CLAS-EG2 experiment at Jefferson Lab measured the EMC effect and SRC abundances simultaneously in carbon, aluminium, iron, and lead, discovering a universal modification function of nucleons in short-range correlated (SRC) pairs that can explain the EMC effect in all measured nuclei.
- The E03-103 experiment at Jefferson Lab focused on high-precision measurements of light nuclei and found that the size of the effect scales with local nuclear density rather than average nuclear density.
- The NA37 experiment of the New Muon Collaboration (NMC) at CERN.

== Possible explanations ==
The EMC effect is surprising because of the difference in energy scales between nuclear binding and deep inelastic scattering. Typical binding energies for nucleons in nuclei are on the order of 10 megaelectron volts (MeV). Typical energy transfers in DIS are on the order of several gigaelectron volts (GeV). Nuclear binding effects were therefore believed to be insignificant when measuring quark distributions.

A number of hypotheses for the cause of the EMC effect have been offered. While many older hypotheses, such as Fermi motion (see Fig. 2), nuclear pions, and others have been ruled out by electron scattering or Drell–Yan data, modern hypotheses generally fall into two viable categories: mean-field modification, and short-range correlated pairs.

=== Mean-field modification ===
The mean-field modification hypothesis suggests that the nuclear environment leads to a modification of nucleon structure. As an illustration, consider that the average density inside a nuclear matter is approximately 0.16 nucleons per fm^{3}. If nuclei were hard spheres, their radius would be approximately 1.1 fm, leading to a density of only 0.13 nucleons per fm^{3}, assuming ideal close-packing.

Nuclear matter is dense, and the close proximity of nucleons may allow quarks in different nucleons to interact directly, leading to nucleon modification. Mean-field models predict that all nucleons experience some degree of structure modification, and they are consistent with the observation that the EMC effect increases with nuclear size, scales with local density, and saturates for very large nuclei. Furthermore, mean-field models also predict a large "polarized EMC effect": a large modification of the spin-dependent g_{1} structure function for nuclei relative to that of their constituent protons and neutrons. This prediction will be tested experimentally using measurements of a polarized Li-7 target as part of the Jefferson Lab CLAS-12 program.

=== Short-range correlations (SRC) ===
Rather than all nucleons experiencing some modification, the short-range correlations hypothesis predicts that most nucleons at any one time are unmodified, but some are substantially modified. The most heavily modified nucleons are those in temporary short-range correlated (SRC) pairs. It has been observed that approximately 20% of nucleons (in medium and heavy nuclei) at any given moment are part of short-lived pairs with significant spatial overlap with a partner nucleon.

The nucleons in these pairs then recoil apart with large back-to-back momenta of several hundred MeV/c – larger than the nuclear Fermi momentum – making them the highest-momentum nucleons in the nucleus. In the short-range correlations (SRC) hypothesis, the EMC effect emerges from large modification of these high-momentum SRC nucleons.

This explanation is supported by the observation that the size of the EMC effect in different nuclei correlates linearly with the density of SRC pairs. This hypothesis predicts increasing modification as a function of nucleon momentum, which was tested using recoil-tagging techniques in experiments at Jefferson Lab. The results showed definitive evidence in favor of SRC.
