= TMD =

TMD may refer to:

== Arts and entertainment ==
- Team Deathmatch, a gaming mode
- Telemundo, a Spanish-language television network
- The Medic Droid, a synthpop band
- "Truly Madly Deeply", a 1997 song by Savage Garden

== Military ==
- Texas Military Department, United States
- Theater missile defense, targeting medium-range missiles

== Science ==
- Temporomandibular joint dysfunction, a jaw condition
- Transmembrane domain, part of proteins
- Transition metal dichalcogenide monolayers, a thin semiconductor material
- Transverse momentum distributions, in particle physics experiments

== Technology ==
- Thorn Microwave Devices, a brand of Thorn Electrical Industries
- Tip-magnetic driving, a fan technology
- Tuned mass damper, a vibration absorber

== Other uses ==
- Traction maintenance depot, a rail engine shed
- Trade Marks Directive, a European Union law
- Tottenham Mandem, an English street gang
- Turkish Mathematical Society
