= Form factor =

Form factor or form-factor may refer to:

== Science and technology ==
=== Computing and electronics ===
- Form factor (design), an aspect of design which defines and prescribes the size, shape, and other physical specifications
  - Form factor (mobile phones)
  - Motherboard form factor
  - Hard disk drive form factor
- Form factor (electronics), the functional form of oscillating signals

=== Physics ===
- Form factor (quantum field theory), a semi-empirical formula used in effective quantum field theories
- Atomic form factor, or atomic scattering factor, a measure of the amplitude of a wave scattered from an isolated atom
- Electric form factor, the Fourier transform of electric charge distribution in space
- Magnetic form factor, the Fourier transform of an electric current distribution in space
- Form factor (radiative transfer), the proportion of energy transmitted by that object which can be transferred to another object

== Other uses ==
- Form factor, the tree shape in forest inventory timber metrics
- FormFactor, Inc., a semiconductor test and measurement company

== See also ==
- Structure factor, in condensed matter physics
