= SLAC bag model =

Theoretical Model

The SLAC bag model is a simple theoretical model for a possible structure for hadrons. The MIT bag model is another similar model. The "SLAC" in the name stands for Stanford Linear Accelerator Center.

The chiral bag model is a variant of the MIT bag model that couples pions to the bag boundary, with the pion field being modeled by the skyrmion. In this model, the boundary condition is that the axial vector current is continuous across the boundary, with free (non-interacting) quarks on the inside, obeying the boundary condition.

== See also ==
- Fermi ball
- Partons
