= CDHS =

CDHS may refer to

- The Central Dauphin High School in Pennsylvania.
- CDHS, a neutrino experiment at CERN.
- Colorado Department of Human Services
- The Cheongju Daeseong High School in Cheongju, Korea.
