= Peter Pusey =

British physicist (born 1942)

- Born: Peter Nicholas Pusey; 30 December 1942 (age 83)
- Education: University of Cambridge; Pittsburgh University (PhD)
- Awards: FRS (1996); Rhodia Prize (2005)
- Scientific career
- Fields: Condensed matter physics
- Workplaces: IBM Research; Royal Signals and Radar Establishment; University of Edinburgh

Peter Nicholas Pusey (born 30 December 1942) FRSE FRS is a British physicist. He is an Emeritus Professor of Physics at the School of Physics and Astronomy of the University of Edinburgh.

== Research ==
Pusey is a pioneer of dynamic light scattering (DLS) and is known for elucidating the structure and dynamics of concentrated colloidal suspensions. He contributed to the development, underlying theory and applications of DLS. He was among the first to apply photon correlation techniques and, with colleagues, developed the now standard method of cumulant analysis for particle sizing. His theory, with William van Megen, of DLS by non-ergodic media resolved long-standing difficulties, allowing DLS studies of amorphous solid-like systems such as polymer gels and glassy colloidal suspensions.

With his work on the Brownian motions of strongly interacting particles, Pusey was one of the first to apply microscopic approaches to colloidal suspensions. His research exploited analogies and differences between concentrated suspensions of hard-sphere colloids and atomic materials, to investigate such fundamental phenomena as crystallisation, the glass transition and the formation of ordered binary superlattices.

With Eric Jakeman, Pusey also introduced K-distributions; these have proved powerful in describing the statistical properties of, for example, microwaves scattered by the sea surface and laser light propagating through the atmosphere.

== Awards and honours ==
Pusey was elected a Fellow of the Royal Society (FRS) in 1996 and Fellow of the Royal Society of Edinburgh in the same year. In 2005, he was awarded the Rhodia Prize by the European Colloid and Interface Society for his Outstanding contributions in the experimental study of dynamically arrested (glassy) particulate matter, especially in relation to hard sphere fluids with added polymer.
