= Jet quenching =

Phenomenon in high-energy physics

In high-energy physics, jet quenching is a phenomenon that can occur in the collision of ultra-high-energy particles. In general, the collision of high-energy particles can produce jets of elementary particles that emerge from these collisions. Collisions of ultra-relativistic heavy-ion particle beams create a hot and dense medium comparable to the conditions in the early universe, and then these jets interact strongly with the medium, leading to a marked reduction of their energy. This energy reduction is called "jet quenching".

== Physics background ==
In the context of high-energy hadron collisions, quarks and gluons are collectively called partons. The jets emerging from the collisions originally consist of partons, which quickly combine to form hadrons, a process called hadronization. Only the resulting hadrons can be directly observed. The hot, dense medium produced in the collisions is also composed of partons; it is known as a quark–gluon plasma (QGP). In this realm, the laws of physics that apply are those of quantum chromodynamics (QCD).

High-energy nucleus–nucleus collisions make it possible to study the properties of the QGP medium through the observed changes in the jet fragmentation functions as compared to the unquenched case. According to QCD, high-momentum partons produced in the initial stage of a nucleus–nucleus collision will undergo multiple interactions inside the collision region prior to hadronization. In these interactions, the energy of the partons is reduced through collisional energy loss and medium-induced gluon radiation, the latter being the dominant mechanism in a QGP. The effect of jet quenching in QGP is the main motivation for studying jets as well as high-momentum particle spectra and particle correlations in heavy-ion collisions. Accurate jet reconstruction will allow measurements of the jet fragmentation functions and consequently the degree of quenching and therefore provide insight on the properties of the hot dense QGP medium created in the collisions.

== Experimental evidence of jet quenching ==
First evidence of parton energy loss has been observed at the Relativistic Heavy Ion Collider (RHIC) from the suppression of high-pt particles studying the nuclear modification factor and the suppression of back-to-back correlations.

In ultra-relativistic heavy-ion collisions at center-of-momentum energy of 2.76 and 5.02 TeV at the Large Hadron Collider (LHC), interactions between the high-momentum parton and the hot, dense medium produced in the collisions, are expected to lead to jet quenching. Indeed, in November 2010 CERN announced the first direct observation of jet quenching, based on experiments with heavy-ion collisions, which involved ATLAS, CMS and ALICE.

== See also ==
- Parity (physics)
