= Fermi ball =

Hypothetical objects created in the early history of the universe

In cosmology, Fermi balls are hypothetical objects that may have been created in the early history of the universe by spontaneous symmetry breaking. One paper has described them as "charged SLAC-bag type structures". Fermi balls can be modeled as a type of non-topological soliton.

The collapse of Fermi balls is also an active area of research, and it is hypothesized that they collapse to form primordial black holes. This mechanism is initiated after the Yukawa potential begins to play a role after the Fermi balls become unstable.

The concept is named after Enrico Fermi (see Fermion).

== Hypothesized explanations for observed phenomena ==
=== Dark matter ===
A paper by theoretical physicists at Seoul National University has proposed that Fermi balls may be implicated in the formation of primordial black holes from a cosmic first-order phase transition, as a candidate explanation for dark matter.
