= List of fellows of the Royal Society elected in 1996 =

This is a list of fellows of the Royal Society elected in 1996.

== Fellows ==
- Alfred Rodney Adams
- Jan Mary Anderson
- Jonathan Felix Ashmore
- David Beach
- John Michael Brown
- Christopher Martin Dobson
- Patrick Joseph Dowling
- Dianne Edwards
- Peter Philip Edwards
- Andrew Christopher Fabian
- William James Feast
- Michael Denis Gale (1943–2009)
- David Gubbins
- Frederick Duncan Michael Haldane
- Thomas Michael Jessell
- Sir David Philip Lane
- Martin Geoffrey Low (1950-2013)
- Andrew Geoffrey Lyne
- Nicholas Stephen Manton
- Francis Patrick McCormick
- Iain MacIntyre (d. 2009)
- Thomas Wilson Meade
- Stewart Crichton Miller (1934-1999)
- Ian Mark Mills (1930–2022)
- Mudumbai Seshachalu Narasimhan
- Linda Partridge
- Malcolm Peaker
- John Anthony Pickett
- Peter Nicholas Pusey
- Sir Martin Roth (1917-2006)
- Christopher Tadeusz Czeslaw Sachrajda
- Ekhard Karl Hermann Salje
- Timothy Shallice
- George David William Smith
- Edwin Smith
- David Ian Stuart
- Grant Robert Sutherland
- Martin John Taylor
- Phillip Vallentine Tobias (1925–2012)
- James Hunter Whitelaw (1936-2006)

== Foreign members ==
- James Edwin Darnell
- Jacques Louis Lions (1928-2001)
- Vernon Benjamin Mountcastle
- James Robert Rice
- Michael G Rossmann
- Martin Schwarzschild (1912-1997)
