= Drell–Yan process =

Process in high-energy hadron–hadron scattering

Drell–Yan process: a quark from one hadron and an antiquark from another hadron annihilate to create a pair of leptons through the exchange of a virtual photon.

The Drell–Yan process occurs in high energy hadron–hadron scattering. It takes place when a quark of one hadron and an antiquark of another hadron annihilate, creating a virtual photon or Z boson which then decays into a pair of oppositely-charged leptons. Importantly, the energy of the colliding quark–antiquark pair can be almost entirely transformed into the mass of new particles. This process was first suggested by Sidney Drell and Tung-Mow Yan in 1970 to describe the production of lepton–antilepton pairs in high-energy hadron collisions. Experimentally, this process was first observed by J. H. Christenson et al. in proton–uranium collisions at the Alternating Gradient Synchrotron.

== Overview ==
The Drell–Yan process is studied both in fixed-target and collider experiments. It provides valuable information about the parton distribution functions (PDFs) which describe the way the momentum of an incoming high-energy nucleon is partitioned among its constituent partons. These PDFs are basic ingredients for calculating essentially all processes at hadron colliders. Although PDFs should be derivable in principle, current ignorance of some aspects of the strong force prevents this. Instead, the forms of the PDFs are deduced from experimental data.

== Drell–Yan process and deep inelastic scattering ==
PDFs are determined using the world data from deep inelastic scattering, Drell–Yan process, etc. The Drell–Yan process is closely related to the deep inelastic scattering; the Feynman diagram of the Drell–Yan process is obtained if the Feynman diagram of deep inelastic scattering is rotated by 90°. A time-like virtual photon or Z boson is produced in s-channel in the Drell–Yan process while a space-like virtual photon or Z boson is produced in t-channel in the deep inelastic scattering.

== Sensitivity to light sea quark flavor asymmetry in the proton ==
It had been naively believed that the quark sea in the proton was formed by quantum chromodynamics (QCD) processes that did not discriminate between up and down quarks. However, results of deep inelastic scattering of high energy muons on a proton and a deuteron targets by CERN-NMC showed that there are more d̅'s than u̅'s in the proton. The Gottfried sum measured by NMC was 0.235±0.026, which is significantly smaller than the expected value of 1/3. This means that d̅(x)-u̅(x) integrated over Bjorken x from 0 to 1.0 is 0.147±0.039, indicating a flavor asymmetry in the proton sea. Recent measurements using Drell–Yan scattering probed the flavor asymmetry of the proton. To leading order in the strong interaction coupling constant, α_{s}, the Drell-Yan cross section is given by

$\frac{d^2 \sigma}{dx_1 dx_2} = \frac{4\pi \alpha}{9sx_1 x_2}\sum_{i\in u,d,s,\cdots} e_i^2 \left[q_i^A(x_1)\bar{q}^B_i(x_2) + \bar{q}_i^A(x_1)q^B_i(x_2) \right]$

where $\alpha$ is the fine-structure constant, $s$ is the center-of-mass energy squared, $e_i$ is the charge of quark with flavor $i$, and $q_i^{A,B} (x_{1,2} )$ denote the parton distribution function of in hadron $A$ and hadron $B$, with momentum $x_1$ and $x_2$, respectively. Similarly $\bar{q}_i^{A,B} (x_{1,2} )$ denotes the antiquark distributions.

Using the isospin symmetry, the parton distribution functions for proton and neutron are related as follows:

$$\begin{align}
u(x) &\equiv u^p(x) = d^n (x) \\
d(x) &\equiv d^p(x) = u^n (x) \\
\bar{u}(x) &\equiv \bar{u}^p(x) = \bar{d}^n(x) \\
\bar{d}(x) &\equiv d^p(x) = \bar{u}^n(x) \\
\end{align}$$

Therefore, the proton on deuterium over proton on hydrogen Drell-Yan cross section can be written as

$$\begin{align}
\frac{\sigma^{pd}}{2\sigma^{pp}} &= \frac{\sigma^{pn}+\sigma^{pp}}{2\sigma^{pp}}\\
& =\frac{1}{2} \left[1+ \frac{4u(x_1)\bar{d}(x_2) + d(x_1)\bar{u}(x_2)}{4u(x_1)\bar{u}(x_2) + d(x_1)\bar{d}(x_2)}\right]
\end{align}$$

Using the fact that there are more $u$ quarks in proton, this ratio can be approximated as

$$\frac{\sigma^{pd}}{2\sigma^{pp}} \approx \frac{1}{2}\left[1+ \frac{\bar{d}(x_2)}{\bar{u}(x_2)}\right]$$

where $\bar{d}(x)$ and $\bar{u}(x)$ are the anti-down and anti-up quark distributions in the proton sea and $x$ is the Bjorken-$x$ scaling variable (the momentum fraction of the target quark in the parton model).

== Z boson production ==
The production of Z bosons through the Drell–Yan process affords the opportunity to study the couplings of the Z boson to quarks. The main observable is the forward–backward asymmetry in the angular distribution of the two leptons in their center-of-mass frame.

If heavier neutral gauge bosons exist (see W′ and Z′ bosons), they might be discovered as a peak in the dilepton invariant mass spectrum in much the same way that the standard Z boson appears by virtue of the Drell–Yan process.

== Drell–Yan process and the underlying event ==
Even though high-energy QCD processes are accessible via perturbation theory, lower-energy effects like hadronization are still only understood from a phenomenological perspective. Since virtual photons and Z bosons are unable to transport color charges, the properties of the underlying event can be studied effectively in selections of Drell–Yan $Z^0 (\gamma^*) \to \ell^+ \ell^-$ events, where the hadronic background is ignored. What is left is the pure underlying event, insensitive to the physics of the hard Drell–Yan process. Other processes may suffer from misidentification issues, since they might also produce hadronic jets in the hard process.

== See also ==
- Fermilab E-906/SeaQuest
