= Fermi motion =

The Fermi motion is the quantum motion of nucleons bound inside a nucleus. It was once posited as an explanation for the EMC effect.
