= Fragmentation function =

In a sufficiently hard interaction between particles, the cross section can be factorized into parton distribution functions (PDFs), the hard scattering part, and fragmentation functions. The fragmentation functions, as are the PDFs, are non-perturbative functions describing the production of a given observed final state. In a leading order picture, it can be interpreted as the probability that the observed final state originates from a given quark or gluon.

== See also ==
- Proton structure function
