= Form factor (quantum field theory) =

Function approximating net physical effect

In elementary particle physics and mathematical physics, in particular in effective field theory, a form factor is a function that encapsulates the properties of a certain particle interaction without including all of the underlying physics, but instead, providing the momentum dependence of suitable matrix elements. It is further measured experimentally in confirmation or specification of a theory—see experimental particle physics.

== Photon–nucleon example ==
For example, at low energies the interaction of a photon with a nucleon is a very complicated calculation involving interactions between the photon and a sea of quarks and gluons, and often the calculation cannot be fully performed from first principles. Often in this context, form factors are also called "structure functions", since they can be used to describe the structure of the nucleon.

However, the generic Lorentz-invariant form of the matrix element for the electromagnetic current interaction is known,

$$\varepsilon_\mu \bar{N}\left(\alpha(q^2) \gamma^\mu +  \beta(q^2) q^\mu + \kappa(q^2) \sigma^{\mu \nu} q_\nu \right)N  \,$$

where $q^\mu$ represents the photon momentum (equal in magnitude to E/c, where E is the energy of the photon). The three functions: $\alpha, \beta , \kappa$ are associated to the electric and magnetic form factors for this interaction, and are routinely measured experimentally; these three effective vertices can then be used to check, or perform calculations that would otherwise be too difficult to perform from first principles. This matrix element then serves to determine the transition amplitude involved in the scattering interaction or the respective particle decay—cf. Fermi's golden rule.

In general, the Fourier transforms of form factor components correspond to electric charge or magnetic profile space distributions (such as the charge radius) of the hadron involved. The analogous QCD structure functions are a probe of the quark and gluon distributions of nucleons.

== See also ==
- Structure function
- Atomic form factor
- Electric form factor
- Magnetic form factor
- Photon structure function
- Quantum field theory
- Standard Model
- Quantum mechanics
- Special relativity
- Charge radius
