= QCD sum rules =

Non-perturbative technique in quantum chromodynamics

In quantum chromodynamics, the confining and strong coupling nature of the theory means that conventional perturbative techniques often fail to apply. The QCD sum rules (or Shifman–Vainshtein–Zakharov sum rules) are a way of dealing with this. The idea is to work with gauge invariant operators and operator product expansions of them. The vacuum to vacuum correlation function for the product of two such operators can be reexpressed as

$$\left\langle 0 | T\left\{ \mathcal{O}_1(x) \mathcal{O}_2(0) \right\} | 0 \right\rangle$$

where we have inserted hadronic particle states on the right hand side.

== Overview ==
Instead of a model-dependent treatment in terms of constituent quarks, hadrons are represented by their interpolating quark currents taken at large virtualities. The correlation function of these currents is introduced and treated in the framework of the operator product expansion (OPE), where the short and long-distance quark-gluon interactions are separated. The former are calculated using QCD perturbation theory, whereas the latter are parametrized in terms of universal vacuum condensates or light-cone distribution amplitudes. The result of the QCD calculation is then matched, via dispersion relation, to a sum over hadronic states. The sum rule obtained in this way allows to calculate observable characteristics of the hadronic ground state. Inversely, the parameters of QCD such as quark masses and vacuum condensate densities can be extracted from sum rules which have experimentally known hadronic parts. The interactions of quark-gluon currents with QCD vacuum fields critically depend on the quantum numbers (spin, parity, flavor content) of these currents.

== See also ==
- Quantum chromodynamics
- Lattice QCD
- Sum rules (Quantum Field Theory)
- Sum rule in quantum mechanics
