= Sidney Drell =

American physicist (1926–2016)

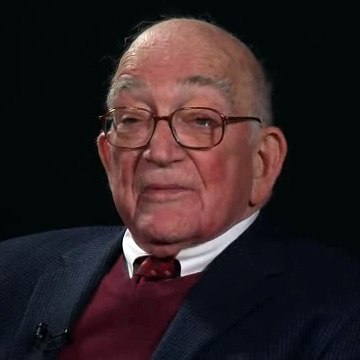
- Born: September 13, 1926; Atlantic City, New Jersey, U.S.
- Died: December 21, 2016 (aged 90); Palo Alto, California, U.S.
- Education: Princeton University; University of Illinois
- Known for: Drell–Yan process
- Children: 3, including Persis
- Awards: E. O. Lawrence Award (1972); Pomeranchuk Prize (1998); Enrico Fermi Award (2000); Heinz Award for Public Policy (2005); National Medal of Science (2011)
- Scientific career
- Fields: Physics
- Workplaces: Stanford Linear Accelerator Center
- Thesis: Part I Magnetic internal conversion coefficient Part II Electrostatic scattering of neutrons Part III Anomalous magnetic moments of nucleons (1949)
- Doctoral advisor: Sidney Dancoff
- Doctoral students: James Bjorken; Steven Frautschi; Roscoe Giles; Robert Jaffe; Heinz Pagels; Joel Primack

Sidney David Drell (September 13, 1926 – December 21, 2016) was an American theoretical physicist and arms control expert.

At the time of his death, he was professor emeritus at the Stanford Linear Accelerator Center (SLAC) and senior fellow at Stanford University's Hoover Institution. Drell was a noted contributor in the fields of quantum electrodynamics and high-energy particle physics. The Drell–Yan process, which was used to discover the Higgs boson, is partially named for him.

== Biography ==
Drell's parents immigrated to America from Ukraine early in the twentieth century and both went on to obtain college degrees. Born in Atlantic City, New Jersey on September 13, 1926, Drell graduated from Atlantic City High School in 1943, at the age of sixteen.

Drell entered Princeton for the summer term in July 1943, and worked with Josef-Maria Jauch in his junior year and completing his senior thesis "Radiating Electrons" with John Archibald Wheeler. He earned his undergraduate degree in physics from Princeton University in 1946. He was awarded a masters in physics in 1947 and received his PhD from the University of Illinois at Urbana–Champaign in 1949. He co-authored the textbooks Relativistic Quantum Mechanics and Relativistic Quantum Fields with James Bjorken.

Drell was active as a scientific advisor to the U.S. government, and was a founding member of the JASON Defense Advisory Group. He was also on the board of directors of Los Alamos National Security, the company that operates the Los Alamos National Laboratory. He was an expert in the field of nuclear arms control and cofounder of the Center for International Security and Arms Control, now the Center for International Security and Cooperation. He was a Senior Fellow at Stanford's Hoover Institution and a trustee Emeritus at the Institute for Advanced Study in Princeton, New Jersey.

In early 1970s, Drell (together with Tung-Mow Yan) did theoretical calculations of lepton pair production in hadronic collisions (Drell–Yan process), which became an important way to study the parton structure of hadrons.

He was the father of Persis Drell, former head of SLAC national accelerator lab, former dean of the Stanford University School of Engineering, and (through Fall 2023) provost of Stanford University; Joanna Drell, Professor of History and chair of the Department of History at the University of Richmond; and Daniel Drell, a program officer at the U.S. Department of Energy. Sidney Drell died in December 2016 at his home in Palo Alto, California at the age of 90.

== Awards and honors ==
- Member of the National Academy of Sciences (1969)
- Fellow of the American Academy of Arts and Sciences (1971)
- Member of the American Philosophical Society (1987)
- The 11th Annual Heinz Award in Public Policy
- Enrico Fermi Award, 2000
- National Intelligence Distinguished Service Medal, 2001
- National Medal of Science, 2011 (presented by President Barack Obama on February 1, 2013)
