= Proton spin crisis =

Unsolved physics problem

Unsolved problem in physics
How do the quarks and gluons carry the spin of protons?
More unsolved problems in physics

The proton spin crisis (or proton spin puzzle) is a theoretical crisis precipitated by a 1987 experiment by the European Muon Collaboration (EMC), which tried to determine the distribution of spin within the proton.

Physicists expected that the quarks carry all of a proton's spin. However, not only was the total proton spin carried by quarks far smaller than 100%, these results were consistent with almost zero (4–24%) proton spin being carried by quarks. This surprising and puzzling result was termed the "proton spin crisis". The problem is considered one of the important unsolved problems in physics.

== Background ==
A key question is how the nucleons' spins are distributed amongst their constituent parts ("partons": quarks and gluons). The components of the proton's spin are the expectation values of the individual sources of angular momentum. These values depend on the renormalization scale, because their operators are not separately conserved. Physicists originally expected that valence quarks would carry all of the nucleon spin.

A proton is built from three valence quarks (two up quarks and one down quark), virtual gluons, and virtual (or sea) quarks and antiquarks (virtual particles do not influence the proton's quantum numbers). The ruling hypothesis was that since the proton is stable, it exists in the lowest possible energy level. Therefore, it was expected that the quark's wave function would be the spherically symmetric s-wave with no spatial contribution to angular momentum. The proton is, like each of its quarks, a spin- 1 /2 particle (a fermion). Therefore, it was hypothesized that two of the quarks would have their spins parallel and the third quark would have its spin antiparallel to that of the proton.

== The experiment ==
In this EMC experiment, a quark of a polarized proton target was hit by a polarized muon beam, and the quark's instantaneous spin was measured. In a polarized proton target, all the protons' spins take the same direction, and therefore it was expected that the spin of two out of the three quarks would cancel out and the spin of the third quark would be polarized in the direction of the proton's spin. Thus, the sum of the quarks' spin was expected to be equal to the proton's spin.

Instead, the experiment found that the number of quarks with spin in the proton's spin direction was almost the same as the number of quarks whose spin was in the opposite direction. This is the proton spin crisis. Similar results have been obtained in later experiments.

== Subsequent work ==
A paper published in 2008 showed that more than half of the spin of the proton comes from the spin of its quarks, and that the missing spin is produced by the quarks' orbital angular momentum. This work used relativistic effects together with other quantum chromodynamic properties and explained how they boil down to an overall spatial angular momentum that is consistent with the experimental data. A 2013 paper showed how to calculate the gluon helicity contribution using lattice QCD.

According to physicist Xiangdong Ji in 2017, lattice QCD shows "the theoretical expectation on the fraction of the nucleon spin carried in quark spin is about 30%. Thus there is no substantial discrepancy between the fundamental theory and data."

Monte Carlo calculations have shown that 50% of the proton spin comes from gluon polarization. Results from the RHIC, published in 2016, indicate that gluons may carry even more of protons' spin than quarks do. However, in 2018 lattice QCD calculations indicated that it is the quark orbital angular momentum that is the dominant contribution to the nucleon spin.

In a 2022 AAPPS Bulletin, Keh-Fei Liu calculated that quark spin contributes about 40% of the angular momentum, quark orbital angular momentum contributes about 15%, and gluon orbital angular momentum contributes about 40%. Given various error bars on both theoretical calculations and on experiments, this too is consistent with the observed experimental quark spin contribution of around 30%.
