= Tip-magnetic driving =

Fan technology

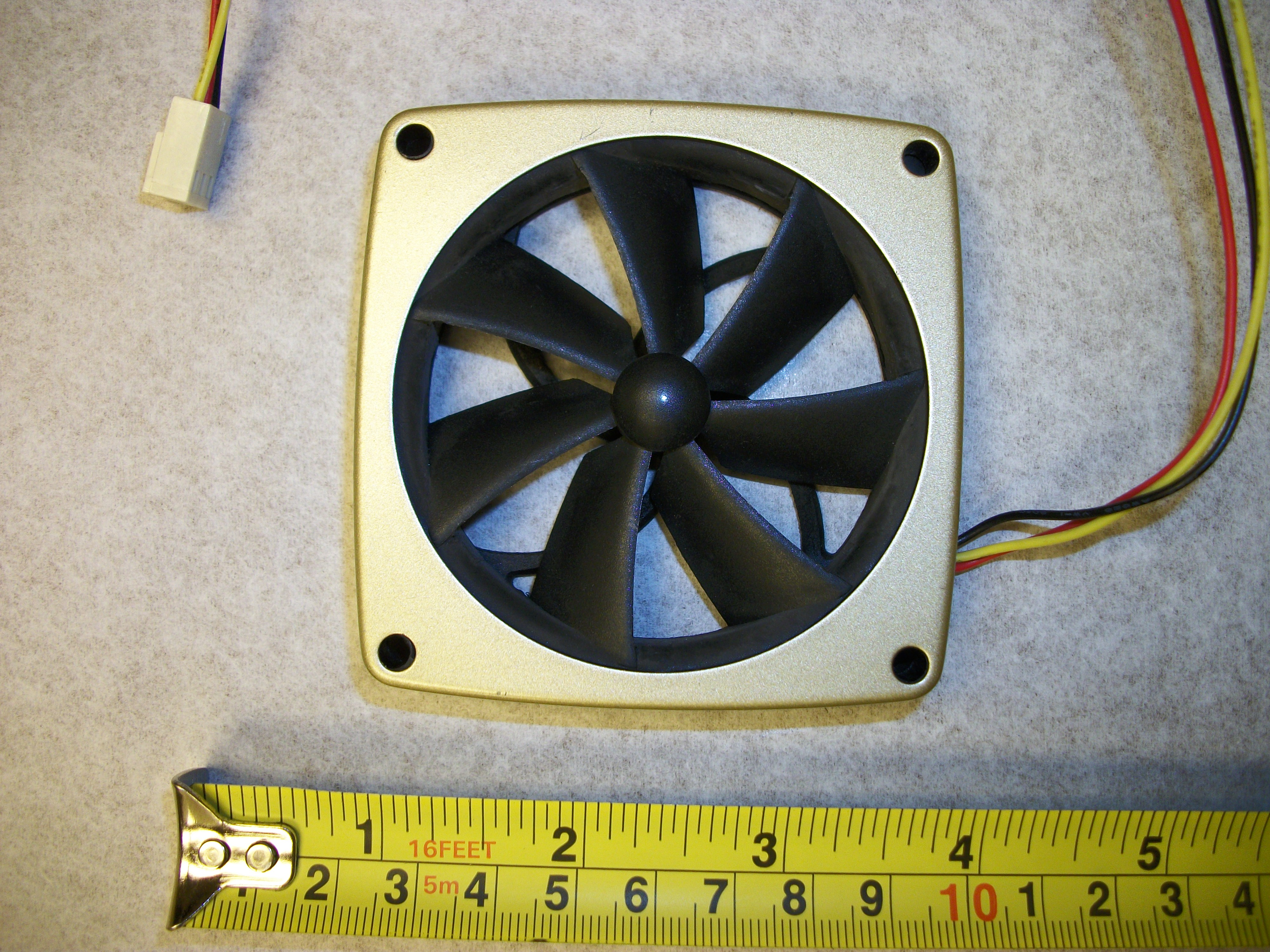

Tip-magnetic driving (TMD) is a fan technology invented by Yen Sun Technology Corporation (also known as Y.S. Tech).

TMD moves the motor out of the hub of the fan and puts it around the edge. The impeller blades are surrounded by a ring studded of twelve magnets which are acted upon by four coils located in the corners of the frame.

The design of a TMD fan reduces approximately 75% of the motor hub area of a traditional fan.

They are known to be a large amount louder than standard hub-motor fans.
