= Magnetic form factor =

Fourier transform

In electromagnetism, a magnetic form factor is the Fourier transform of an electric charge distribution in space.

It can also refer to the Fourier transform of the normalized unpaired spin density ρ_{S}(r),

== See also ==
- Atomic form factor, for the form factor relevant to magnetic diffraction of free neutrons by unpaired outer electrons of an atom.
- Electric form factor
- Form factor (quantum field theory)
