= Sum rule in quantum mechanics =

Rule for energy level transitions

In quantum mechanics, a sum rule is a formula for transitions between energy levels, in which the sum of the transition strengths is expressed in a simple form. Sum rules are used to describe the properties of many physical systems, including solids, atoms, atomic nuclei, and nuclear constituents such as protons and neutrons.

The sum rules are derived from general principles, and are useful in situations where the behavior of individual energy levels is too complex to be described by a precise quantum-mechanical theory. In general, sum rules are derived by using Heisenberg's quantum-mechanical algebra to construct operator equalities, which are then applied to the particles or energy levels of a system.

== Derivation of sum rules ==
Assume that the Hamiltonian $\hat{H}$ has a complete set of eigenfunctions $|n\rangle$ with eigenvalues $E_n$:

$$\hat{H} |n\rangle = E_n |n\rangle.$$

For the Hermitian operator $\hat{A}$ we define the repeated commutator $\hat{C}^{(k)}$ iteratively by:

$$\begin{align}
\hat{C}^{(0)} & \equiv \hat{A}\\
\hat{C}^{(1)} & \equiv [\hat{H}, \hat{A}] = \hat{H}\hat{A}-\hat{A}\hat{H}\\
\hat{C}^{(k)} & \equiv [\hat{H}, \hat{C}^{(k-1)}], \ \ \ k=1,2,\ldots
\end{align}$$

The operator $\hat{C}^{(0)}$ is Hermitian since $\hat{A}$ is defined to be Hermitian. The operator $\hat{C}^{(1)}$ is anti-Hermitian:

$$\left(\hat{C}^{(1)}\right)^\dagger  = (\hat{H}\hat{A})^\dagger-(\hat{A}\hat{H})^\dagger
= \hat{A}\hat{H} - \hat{H}\hat{A} = -\hat{C}^{(1)}.$$

By induction one finds:

$$\left(\hat{C}^{(k)}\right)^\dagger  = (-1)^k \hat{C}^{(k)}$$

and also

$$\langle m | \hat{C}^{(k)} | n \rangle = (E_m-E_n)^k \langle m | \hat{A} | n \rangle.$$

For a Hermitian operator we have

$$|\langle m | \hat{A} | n \rangle|^2 = \langle m | \hat{A} | n \rangle \langle m | \hat{A} | n \rangle^\ast
= \langle m | \hat{A} | n \rangle \langle n | \hat{A} | m \rangle.$$

Using this relation we derive:

$$\begin{align}
\langle m | [\hat{A}, \hat{C}^{(k)} ] | m \rangle
&= \langle m | \hat{A} \hat{C}^{(k)} | m \rangle - \langle m | \hat{C}^{(k)}\hat{A} | m \rangle\\
&= \sum_n \langle m | \hat{A} |n\rangle\langle n| \hat{C}^{(k)} | m \rangle -
\langle m | \hat{C}^{(k)} |n\rangle\langle n| \hat{A} | m \rangle\\
&= \sum_n  \langle m | \hat{A} |n\rangle \langle n| \hat{A}| m \rangle (E_n-E_m)^k -
(E_m-E_n)^k \langle m | \hat{A} |n\rangle\langle n| \hat{A} | m \rangle \\
&= \sum_n (1-(-1)^k) (E_n-E_m)^k |\langle m | \hat{A} | n \rangle|^2.
\end{align}$$

The result can be written as

$$\langle m | [\hat{A}, \hat{C}^{(k)} ] | m \rangle =
\begin{cases}
0,  & \mbox{if }k\mbox{ is even} \\
2 \sum_n  (E_n-E_m)^k |\langle m | \hat{A} | n \rangle|^2, & \mbox{if }k\mbox{ is odd}.
\end{cases}$$

For $k=1$ this gives:

$$\langle m | [\hat{A}, [\hat{H},\hat{A}]] | m \rangle =
2 \sum_n  (E_n-E_m) |\langle m | \hat{A} | n \rangle|^2.$$

== See also ==
- Oscillator strength
- Sum rules (quantum field theory)
- QCD sum rules
