= Operator product expansion =

Non-perturbative approach to quantum field theory

In quantum field theory, the operator product expansion (OPE) is used as an axiom to define the product of fields as a sum over the same fields. As an axiom, it offers a non-perturbative approach to quantum field theory. One example is the vertex operator algebra, which has been used to construct two-dimensional conformal field theories. Whether this result can be extended to QFT in general, thus resolving many of the difficulties of a perturbative approach, remains an open research question.

In practical calculations, such as those needed for scattering amplitudes in various collider experiments, the operator product expansion is used in QCD sum rules to combine results from both perturbative and non-perturbative (condensate) calculations.

== 2D Euclidean quantum field theory ==
In 2D Euclidean field theory, the operator product expansion is a Laurent series expansion associated with two operators. In such an expansion, there are finitely many negative powers of the variable, in addition to potentially infinitely many positive powers of the variable.

This expansion is a locally convergent sum. More precisely, if $y$ is a point, and $A$ and $B$ are operator-valued fields, then there is an open neighborhood $O$ of $y$ such that for all $x \in O\setminus \{y\}$

$$A(x)B(y)=\sum_{i}c_i(x-y) C_i(y)$$

Heuristically, in quantum field theory the interest is in the physical observables represented by operators. To know the result of making two physical observations at two points $z$ and $w$, their operators can be ordered in increasing time.

In conformal coordinate mappings, the radial ordering is instead more relevant. This is the analogue of time ordering where increasing time has been mapped to some increasing radius on the complex plane. Normal ordering of creation operators is useful when working in the second quantization formalism.

A radial-ordered OPE can be written as a normal-ordered OPE minus the non-normal-ordered terms. The non-normal-ordered terms can often be written as a commutator, and these have useful simplifying identities. The radial ordering supplies the convergence of the expansion.

The result is a convergent expansion of the product of two operators in terms of some terms that have poles in the complex plane (the Laurent terms) and terms that are finite. This result represents the expansion of two operators at two different points in the original coordinate system as an expansion around just one point in the space of displacements between points, with terms of the form:

$$\frac{1}{(z-w)^n}$$.

Related to this is that an operator on the complex plane is in general written as a function of $z$ and $\bar{z}$. These are referred to as the holomorphic and anti-holomorphic parts respectively, as they are continuous and differentiable functions with finitely many singularities. In general, the operator product expansion may not separate into holomorphic and anti-holomorphic parts, especially if there are $\log z$ terms in the expansion. However, derivatives of the OPE can often separate the expansion into holomorphic and anti-holomorphic expansions. The resulting expression is also an OPE and in general is more useful.

== Operator product algebra ==
In the generic case, one is given a set of fields (or operators) $A^i(x)$ that are assumed to be valued over some algebra. For example, fixing x, the $A^i(x)$ may be taken to span some Lie algebra. Setting x free to live on a manifold, the operator product $A^i(x)B^j(y)$ is then simply some element in the ring of functions. In general, such rings do not possess enough structure to make meaningful statements; thus, one considers additional axioms to strengthen the system.

The operator product algebra is an associative algebra of the form

$$A^i(x)B^j(y) = \sum_k f^{ij}_k (x,y,z) C^k(z)$$

The structure constants $f^{ij}_k (x,y,z)$ are required to be single-valued functions, rather than sections of some vector bundle. Furthermore, the fields are required to span the ring of functions. In practical calculations, it is usually required that the sums be analytic within some radius of convergence; typically with a radius of convergence of $|x-y|$. Thus, the ring of functions can be taken to be the ring of polynomial functions.

The above can be viewed as a requirement that is imposed on a ring of functions; imposing this requirement on the fields of a conformal field theory is known as the conformal bootstrap.

An example of an operator product algebra is the vertex operator algebra. It is currently hoped that operator product algebras can be used to axiomatize all of quantum field theory; they have successfully done so for the conformal field theories, and whether they can be used as a basis for non-perturbative QFT is an open research area.
