= Structure function =

Probability density function in physics

The structure function, like the fragmentation function, is a probability density function in physics. It is somewhat analogous to the structure factor in solid-state physics, and the form factor (quantum field theory).

The nucleon (proton and neutron) electromagnetic form factors describe the spatial distributions of electric charge and current inside the nucleon and thus are intimately related to its internal structure; these form factors are among the most basic observables of the nucleon. (Nucleons are the building blocks of almost all ordinary matter in the universe. The challenge of understanding the nucleon's structure and dynamics has occupied a central place in nuclear physics.)

The structure functions are important in the study of deep inelastic scattering.

The fundamental understanding of structure functions in terms of QCD is one of the outstanding problems in hadron physics. Why do quarks form colourless hadrons with only two stable configurations, proton and neutron? One important step towards answering this question is to characterize the internal structure of the nucleon. High energy electron scattering provides one of the most powerful tools to investigate this structure.

== See also ==
- Photon structure function
- Fragmentation function
- Parton distribution function
- Transverse momentum distributions
