= Virtual photon =

Concept in physics

Virtual photons are a fundamental concept in particle physics and quantum field theory that play a crucial role in describing the interactions between electrically charged particles. Virtual photons are referred to as "virtual" because they do not exist as free particles in the traditional sense but instead serve as intermediate particles in the exchange of force between other particles. They are responsible for the electromagnetic force that holds matter together, making them a key component in our understanding of the physical world.

Virtual photons are thought of as fluctuations in the electromagnetic field, characterized by their energy, momentum, and polarization. These fluctuations allow electrically charged particles to interact with each other by exchanging virtual photons. The electromagnetic force between two charged particles can be understood as the exchange of virtual photons between them. These photons are constantly being created and destroyed, and the exchange of these virtual photons creates the electromagnetic force that is responsible for interaction between charged particles.

Virtual photons can be classified into positive and negative virtual photons. These classifications are based on the direction of their energy and momentum and their contribution to the electromagnetic force.

If virtual photons exchanged between particles have a positive energy, they contribute to the electromagnetic force as a repulsive force. This means that the two charged particles are repelled from each other and the electromagnetic force pushes them apart. On the other hand, if the virtual photons have a negative energy, they contribute to the electromagnetic force as an attractive force. This means that the two charged particles are attracted to each other and the electromagnetic force pulls them towards each other.

Positive and negative virtual photons are not separate particles, but rather a way of classifying the virtual photons that exist in the electromagnetic field. These classifications are based on the direction of the energy and momentum of the virtual photons and their contribution to the electromagnetic force.

Virtual photons can have a range of polarizations, which can be described as the orientation of the electric and magnetic fields that make up the photon. The polarization of a virtual photon is determined by the direction of its momentum and its interaction with the charges that emit or absorb it. The range of polarizations for virtual photons can be compared to the range of colors for visible light, with each polarization corresponding to a specific orientation of the electric and magnetic fields.

Virtual photons are said to be "off-shell", which means that they do not obey the usual relationship between energy and momentum that applies to real particles. Real photons must always have energy equal to the speed of light times their momentum, but virtual photons can have any energy that is consistent with the uncertainty principle. This allows virtual photons to carry a wide range of energies, even if they are not physically real.

Virtual photons are responsible for Lamb shift, which is a small shift in the energy levels of hydrogen atoms caused by the interaction of the atom with virtual photons in the vacuum. They are also responsible for the Casimir effect, which is the phenomenon of two uncharged metallic plates being attracted to each other due to the presence of virtual photons in the vacuum between them. The attractive force between the plates is caused by a difference in the density of virtual photons on either side of the plates, which creates a net force that pulls them together.
