= Electric form factor =

The electric form factor is the Fourier transform of electric charge distribution in a nucleon. Nucleons (protons and neutrons) are made of up and down quarks which have charges associated with them (2/3 & -1/3, respectively). The study of Form Factors falls within the regime of Perturbative QCD.

The idea originated from young William Thomson.

== See also ==
- Form factor (disambiguation)
