= Deep inelastic scattering =

Type of collision between subatomic particles

Feynman diagram representing deep inelastic scattering of a lepton (l) on a hadron (h), at leading order in perturbative expansion. The virtual photon (γ^{*}) knocks a quark (q) out of the hadron.

In particle physics, deep inelastic scattering is the name given to a process used to probe the inside of hadrons (particularly the baryons, such as protons and neutrons), using electrons, muons and neutrinos. It was first attempted in the 1960s and 1970s and provided the first convincing evidence of the reality of quarks, which up until that point had been considered by many to be a purely mathematical phenomenon. It is an extension of Rutherford scattering to much higher energies of the scattering particle and thus to much finer resolution of the components of the nuclei.

Henry Way Kendall, Jerome Isaac Friedman and Richard E. Taylor were joint recipients of the Nobel Prize of 1990 "for their pioneering investigations concerning deep inelastic scattering of electrons on protons and bound neutrons, which have been of essential importance for the development of the quark model in particle physics."

== Description ==
To explain each part of the terminology, "scattering" refers to the deflection of leptons (electron, muon, etc.) off of hadrons. Measuring the angles of deflection gives information about the nature of the process. "Inelastic" means that the target absorbs some kinetic energy. In fact, at the very high energies of leptons used, the target is "shattered" and emits many new particles. These particles are hadrons and, to oversimplify greatly, the process is interpreted as a constituent quark of the target being "knocked out" of the target hadron, and due to quark confinement, the quarks are not actually observed but instead produce the observable particles by hadronization. "Deep" refers to the high energy of the lepton, which gives it a very short wavelength and hence the ability to probe distances that are small compared with the size of the target hadron, so it can probe "deep inside" the hadron. Also, note that in the perturbative approximation it is a high-energy virtual photon emitted from the lepton and absorbed by the target hadron which transfers energy to one of its constituent quarks, as in the adjacent diagram.

Povh and Rosina pointed out that the term “deep inelastic scattering against nucleons” was coined when the quark substructure of nucleons was unknown. They prefer the term “quasielastic lepton-quark scattering”.

== History ==
The Standard Model of physics, in particular the work of Murray Gell-Mann in the 1960s, had been successful in uniting much of the previously disparate concepts in particle physics into one, relatively straightforward, scheme. In essence, there were three types of particles:

- The leptons, which were low-mass particles such as electrons, neutrinos and their antiparticles. They have integer electric charge.
- The gauge bosons, which were particles that exchange forces. These ranged from the massless, easy-to-detect photon (the carrier of the electro-magnetic force) to the exotic (though still massless) gluons that carry the strong nuclear force.
- The quarks, which were massive particles that carried fractional electric charges. They are the "building blocks" of the hadrons. They are also the only particles to be affected by the strong interaction.

The leptons had been detected since 1897, when J. J. Thomson had shown that electric current is a flow of electrons. Some bosons were being routinely detected, although the W^{+}, W^{−} and Z^{0} particles of the electroweak force were only categorically seen in the early 1980s, and gluons were only firmly pinned down at DESY in Hamburg at about the same time. Quarks, however, were still elusive.

Drawing on Rutherford's groundbreaking experiments in the early years of the 20th century, ideas for detecting quarks were formulated. Rutherford had proven that atoms had a small, massive, charged nucleus at their centre by firing alpha particles at atoms of gold. Most had gone through with little or no deviation, but a few were deflected through large angles or came right back. This suggested that atoms had internal structure and a lot of empty space.

In order to probe the interiors of baryons, a small, penetrating and easily produced particle needed to be used. Electrons were ideal for the role, as they are abundant and easily accelerated to high energies due to their electric charge. In 1968, at the Stanford Linear Accelerator Center (SLAC), electrons were fired at protons and neutrons in atomic nuclei. Later experiments were conducted with muons and neutrinos, but the same principles apply.

The collision absorbs some kinetic energy, and as such it is inelastic. This is a contrast to Rutherford scattering, which is elastic: no loss of kinetic energy. The electron emerges from the nucleus, and its trajectory and velocity can be detected. Analysis of the results led to the conclusion that hadrons do indeed have internal structure. The experiments were important because not only did they confirm the physical reality of quarks, but also proved again that the Standard Model was the correct avenue of research for particle physicists to pursue.

== See also ==
- Semi-inclusive deep inelastic scattering
