= B2FH paper =

1957 paper on stellar origins of elements

The B^{2}FH paper was a landmark scientific paper on the origin of the chemical elements. The paper's title is "Synthesis of the Elements in Stars", but it became known as B^{2}FH from the initials of its authors: Margaret Burbidge, Geoffrey Burbidge, William A. Fowler, and Fred Hoyle. It was written from 1955 to 1956 at the University of Cambridge and Caltech and published in Reviews of Modern Physics in 1957.

The B^{2}FH paper reviewed stellar nucleosynthesis theory and supported it with astronomical and laboratory data. It identified nucleosynthesis processes that are responsible for producing the elements heavier than iron and explained their relative abundances. The paper became highly influential in both astronomy and nuclear physics.

== Nucleosynthesis prior to 1957 ==
Prior to the publication of the B^{2}FH paper, George Gamow advocated a theory of the Universe in which almost all chemical elements, or equivalently atomic nuclei, were synthesized during the Big Bang. Gamow's theory (which differs from present-day Big Bang nucleosynthesis theory) would imply that the abundance of the chemical elements would remain mostly static over time. Arthur Eddington had speculated that the conversion of hydrogen into helium by nuclear fusion could provide the energy required to power stars in 1920. Hans Bethe and Charles L. Critchfield had shown the mechanism for stellar fusion of helium by deriving the proton–proton chain (pp-chain) in 1938. Carl von Weizsäcker and Hans Bethe had independently derived the CNO cycle in 1938 and 1939, respectively. Thus, it was known by Gamow and others that the abundances of hydrogen and helium were not perfectly static. According to their view, fusion in stars would produce small amounts of helium, adding only slightly to its abundance from the Big Bang. This stellar nuclear power did not require substantial stellar nucleosynthesis. The elements from carbon upward remained a mystery.

Fred Hoyle offered a hypothesis for the origin of heavy elements. Beginning with a paper in 1946, and expanded upon in 1954, Hoyle proposed that all atomic nuclei heavier than lithium were synthesized in stars. Both theories agreed that some light nuclei (hydrogen, helium and a small amount of lithium) were not produced in stars, which became the now-accepted theory of Big Bang nucleosynthesis of H, He and Li.

== Physics in the paper ==
The B^{2}FH paper was ostensibly a review article summarising recent advances in the theory of stellar nucleosynthesis. However, it went beyond simply reviewing Hoyle's work, by incorporating observational measurements of elemental abundances published by the Burbidges, and Fowler's laboratory experiments on nuclear reactions. The result was a synthesis of theory and observation, which provided convincing evidence for Hoyle's hypothesis.

The theory predicted that the abundances of the elements would evolve over cosmological time, an idea which is testable by astronomical spectroscopy. Each element has a characteristic set of spectral lines, so stellar spectroscopy can be used to infer the atmospheric composition of individual stars. Observations indicate a strong negative correlation between a star's initial heavy element content (known as the metallicity) and its age. More recently formed stars tend to have higher metallicity.

The early Universe consisted of only the light elements formed during Big Bang nucleosynthesis. Stellar structure and the Hertzsprung–Russell diagram indicate that the length of the lifetime of a star depends greatly on its initial mass, with the most massive stars being very short-lived, and less massive stars are longer-lived. The B^{2}FH paper argued that when a star dies, it will enrich the interstellar medium with 'heavy elements' (in this case all elements heavier than lithium), from which newer stars are formed.

The B^{2}FH paper described key aspects of the nuclear physics and astrophysics involved in how stars produce these heavy elements. By scrutinizing the table of nuclides, the authors identified different stellar environments that could produce the observed isotopic abundance patterns and the nuclear processes that must be responsible for them. The authors invoke nuclear physics processes, now known as the p-process, r-process, and s-process, to account for the elements heavier than iron. The abundances of these heavy elements and their isotopes are roughly 100,000 times less than those of the major elements, which supported Hoyle's 1954 hypothesis of nuclear fusion within the burning shells of massive stars.

B^{2}FH comprehensively outlined and analyzed the nucleosynthesis of the elements heavier than iron by the capture within stars of free neutrons. It advanced much less the understanding of the synthesis of the very abundant elements from silicon to nickel. The paper did not include the carbon-burning process, the oxygen-burning process and the silicon-burning process, each of which contribute to the elements from magnesium to nickel. Hoyle had already suggested that supernova nucleosynthesis could be responsible for these in his 1954 paper. Donald D. Clayton has attributed the lower number of citations to Hoyle's 1954 paper compared to B^{2}FH as a combination of factors: the difficulty of digesting Hoyle's 1954 paper even for his B^{2}FH coauthors, and among astronomers generally; to Hoyle's having described its key equation only in words rather than writing it prominently in his paper; and to Hoyle's incomplete review of the B^{2}FH draft.

== Writing of the paper ==
The Caltech nuclear physicist William Alfred Fowler used his sabbatical leave to visit Hoyle in Cambridge from 1954 to 1955. The pair invited Margaret Burbidge and Geoffrey Burbidge to join them in Cambridge, as the couple had recently published extensive work on stellar abundances that would be required to test Hoyle's hypothesis. The quartet collaborated on several projects whilst in Cambridge; Fowler and Hoyle began work on a review that would become B^{2}FH. Fowler returned to Caltech with the work far from complete, and encouraged the Burbidges to join him in California. Both of the Burbidges had temporary positions created for them in 1956 at Caltech by Fowler for this purpose. The first complete draft was completed by the Burbidges in 1956 at Caltech, after adding extensive astronomical observations and experimental data to support the theory. Margaret Burbidge, the paper's first author, completed much of the work whilst pregnant. The final paper is 104 pages long, with 34 plots, 4 photographic plates, and 22 tables; despite this length, it does not have an abstract.

Some have presumed that Fowler was the leader of the group because the writing and submission for publication were done at Caltech in 1956, but Geoffrey Burbidge has stated that this is a misconception. Fowler, though an accomplished nuclear physicist, was still learning Hoyle's theory in 1955 and later stated that Hoyle was the intellectual leader. The Burbidges also learnt Hoyle's theory during 1954–55 in Cambridge. "There was no leader in the group," G. Burbidge wrote in 2008, "we all made substantial contributions".

== Recognition ==
B^{2}FH drew scientific attention to the field of nuclear astrophysics. By reviewing the theory of stellar nucleosynthesis and supporting it with observational evidence, B^{2}FH firmly established the theory among astronomers.

Fowler was awarded half of the 1983 Nobel Prize in Physics, possibly for his contribution to B^{2}FH. The Nobel committee stated: "Together with a number of co-workers, [Fowler] developed, during the 1950s, a complete theory of the formation of the chemical elements in the universe." Fowler's contributions to B^{2}FH included the nuclear physics of the s-process and the r-process.

Some have argued that Fred Hoyle deserved similar recognition for theoretical work on the topic, and contend that his unorthodox views concerning the Big Bang stopped him being awarded a share of the Nobel Prize. Geoffrey Burbidge, for example, argued in 2008 that "Hoyle should have been awarded a Nobel Prize for this and other work". He also speculated that the reason why Hoyle ended up empty-handed was that "Fowler was believed to be the leader of the group." Burbidge insisted that this perception was false and pointed to Hoyle's earlier foundational papers from 1946 and 1954.

Fowler, in his own Nobel lecture, wrote about Hoyle: "Fred Hoyle was the second great influence in my life. The grand concept of nucleosynthesis in stars was first definitely established by Hoyle in 1946."

Hoyle's biographer Mitton has speculated that Hoyle was left out by the Nobel committee because he had earlier spoken out against the injustice of the Nobel committee overlooking Jocelyn Bell Burnell for the 1974 prize.

In 2007 a conference was held at Caltech in Pasadena, California to commemorate the 50th anniversary of the publication of B^{2}FH, where Geoffrey Burbidge presented remarks on the writing of B^{2}FH.

== See also ==
- Alpher–Bethe–Gamow paper
