= George M. Fuller =

American physicist

George Michael Fuller (born December 25, 1953, in Los Angeles) is an American theoretical physicist, known for his research on nuclear astrophysics involving weak interactions, neutrino flavor-mixing, and quark matter, as well as the hypothetical nuclear matter.

== Education and career ==
He graduated in physics with a BS in 1976 and a PhD in 1981 from California Institute of Technology (Caltech). His PhD thesis entitled Nuclear weak interaction rates during stellar evolution and collapse was supervised by William A. Fowler. Fuller was from 1981 to 1983 a Robert R. McCormick Fellow at the University of Chicago (where he worked with Schramm and Arnett) and from 1983 to 1984 a postdoctoral visiting research astrophysicist at UC Santa Cruz's Lick Observatory (where he worked with Woosley). Fuller was from 1985 to 1986 a research assistant professor at the University of Washington's Institute for Nuclear Theory and from 1986 to 1988 a staff member in the Institute of Geophysics and Planetary Physics (IGPP) astrophysics group at Lawrence Livermore National Laboratory. In the department of physics of the University of California, San Diego (UCSD) he was from 1988 to 1992 an associate professor and is since 1992 a full professor. At UCSD he is now a distinguished professor of physics and the director of the Center for Astrophysics and Space Science (CASS). He was one of six UCSD scientists (including Brian Keating) involved in the early stages of the international collaboration for the POLARBEAR experiment.

Fuller's work has revolved around the interplay of the weak interaction, nuclei, and gravitation in the cosmos. The recent focus of his work has been on neutrino physics, in particular the role of neutrino mass and flavor mixing in the early universe and in core collapse supernovae, the synthesis of the light and heavy nuclei, and cosmology.

He was elected in 1994 a fellow of the American Physical Society. In 2013 he was awarded the Hans A. Bethe Prize with citation:

For outstanding contributions to nuclear astrophysics, especially his seminal work on weak interaction rates for stellar evolution and collapse and his pioneering research on neutrino flavor-mixing in supernovae.

== Selected publications ==
=== Articles ===
- Fuller, G. M.; Fowler, W. A.; Newman, M. J. (1982). "Stellar weak interaction rates for intermediate mass nuclei. III - Rate tables for the free nucleons and nuclei with A = 21 to A = 60". The Astrophysical Journal Supplement Series. 48: 279. Bibcode:1982ApJS...48..279F. doi:10.1086/190779. S2CID 119485901. (over 500 citations)
- Fuller, G. M.; Fowler, W. A.; Newman, M. J. (1985). "Stellar weak interaction rates for intermediate-mass nuclei. IV - Interpolation procedures for rapidly varying lepton capture rates using effective log (Ft)-values". The Astrophysical Journal. 293: 1. Bibcode:1985ApJ...293....1F. doi:10.1086/163208. S2CID 121413911. (over 500 citations)
- Alcock, C.; Fuller, G. M.; Mathews, G. J. (1987). "The quark-hadron phase transition and primordial nucleosynthesis". The Astrophysical Journal. 320: 439. Bibcode:1987ApJ...320..439A. doi:10.1086/165560. S2CID 119758640.
- Fuller, G. M.; Mathews, G. J.; Alcock, C. R. (1988). "Quark-hadron phase transition in the early Universe: Isothermal baryon-number fluctuations and primordial nucleosynthesis". Physical Review D. 37 (6): 1380–1400. Bibcode:1988PhRvD..37.1380F. doi:10.1103/PhysRevD.37.1380. PMID 9958827. S2CID 31053837.
- Qian, Yong-Zhong; Fuller, George M.; Mathews, Grant J.; Mayle, Ron W.; Wilson, James R.; Woosley, S. E. (1993). "Connection between flavor-mixing of cosmologically significant neutrinos and heavy element nucleosynthesis in supernovae". Physical Review Letters. 71 (13): 1965–1968. Bibcode:1993PhRvL..71.1965Q. doi:10.1103/PhysRevLett.71.1965. PMID 10054549. S2CID 41193046.
- Shi, Xiangdong; Fuller, George M. (1999). "New Dark Matter Candidate: Nonthermal Sterile Neutrinos". Physical Review Letters. 82 (14): 2832–2835. arXiv:astro-ph/9810076. Bibcode:1999PhRvL..82.2832S. doi:10.1103/PhysRevLett.82.2832. S2CID 11707302. (over 750 citations)
- Sneden, Christopher; Cowan, John J.; Ivans, Inese I.; Fuller, George M.; Burles, Scott; Beers, Timothy C.; Lawler, James E. (2000). "Evidence of Multiple r-Process Sites in the Early Galaxy: New Observations of CS 22892−052". The Astrophysical Journal. 533 (2): L139–L142. arXiv:astro-ph/0003086. Bibcode:2000ApJ...533L.139S. doi:10.1086/312631. PMID 10770709. S2CID 30502.
- Abazajian, Kevork; Fuller, George M.; Tucker, Wallace H. (2001). "Direct Detection of Warm Dark Matter in the X-Ray". The Astrophysical Journal. 562 (2): 593–604. arXiv:astro-ph/0106002. Bibcode:2001ApJ...562..593A. doi:10.1086/323867. S2CID 14738694. (over 600 citations)
- Duan, Huaiyu; Fuller, George M.; Qian, Yong-Zhong (2006). "Collective neutrino flavor transformation in supernovae". Physical Review D. 74 (12) 123004. arXiv:astro-ph/0511275. Bibcode:2006PhRvD..74l3004D. doi:10.1103/PhysRevD.74.123004. S2CID 39990557.
- Duan, Huaiyu; Fuller, George M.; Qian, Yong-Zhong (2007). "Simple picture for neutrino flavor transformation in supernovae". Physical Review D. 76 (8) 085013. arXiv:0706.4293. Bibcode:2007PhRvD..76h5013D. doi:10.1103/PhysRevD.76.085013. S2CID 119711361.
- Duan, Huaiyu; Fuller, George M.; Qian, Yong-Zhong (2010). "Collective Neutrino Oscillations". Annual Review of Nuclear and Particle Science. 60: 569–594. arXiv:1001.2799. Bibcode:2010ARNPS..60..569D. doi:10.1146/annurev.nucl.012809.104524. S2CID 118656162. (over 500 citations)
- Patwardhan, Amol V.; Fuller, George M.; Kishimoto, Chad T.; Kusenko, Alexander (2015). "Diluted equilibrium sterile neutrino dark matter". Physical Review D. 92 (10) 103509. arXiv:1507.01977. Bibcode:2015PhRvD..92j3509P. doi:10.1103/PhysRevD.92.103509. S2CID 117730973.
- Grohs, Evan B.; Richard Bond, J.; Cooke, Ryan J.; Fuller, George M.; Meyers, Joel; Paris, Mark W. (2019). "Big Bang Nucleosynthesis and Neutrino Cosmology". Bulletin of the American Astronomical Society. 51 (3): 412. arXiv:1903.09187. Bibcode:2019BAAS...51c.412G.
- Takhistov, Volodymyr; Fuller, George M.; Kusenko, Alexander (2021). "Test for the Origin of Solar Mass Black Holes". Physical Review Letters. 126 (7) 071101. arXiv:2008.12780. Bibcode:2021PhRvL.126g1101T. doi:10.1103/PhysRevLett.126.071101. PMID 33666480. S2CID 221377306.

=== Books ===
- Mezzacappa, Anthony; Fuller, George M., eds. (2005). Open Issues in Core Collapse Supernova Theory. Proceedings from the Institute for Nuclear Theory, University of Washington, Seattle, 22–24 June 2004 — vol. 14. Singapore: World Scientific. ISBN 978-981-270-344-6.
