= Margaret Burbidge =

British-born American astrophysicist

Margaret Burbidge FRS
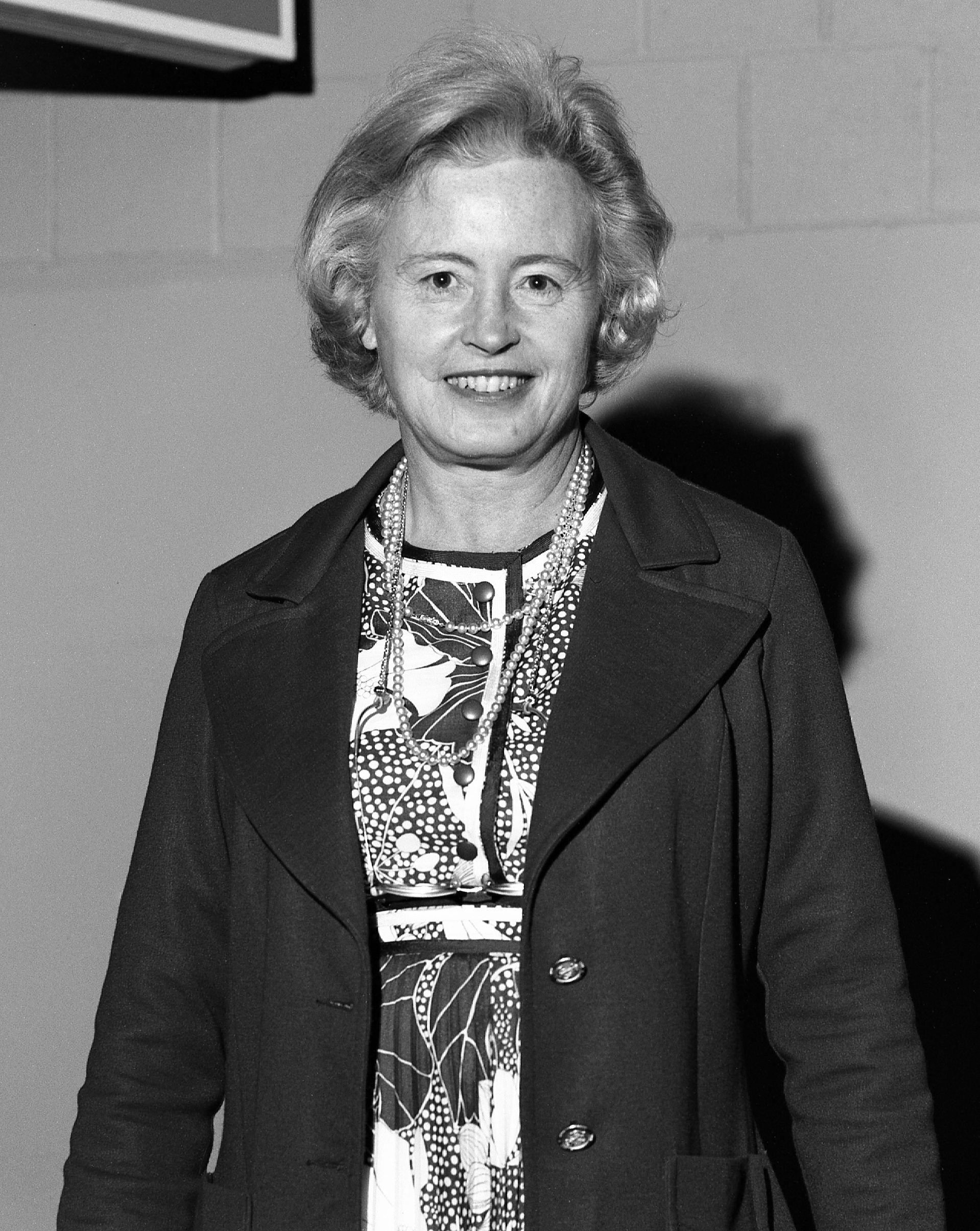
- Burbidge in 1974
- Born: Eleanor Margaret Peachey; 12 August 1919; Davenport, Stockport, UK
- Died: 5 April 2020 (aged 100); San Francisco, California
- Citizenship: British; American (from 1977)
- Education: University College London (Bachelors, PhD)
- Known for: B2FH paper
- Spouse: Geoffrey Burbidge
- Awards: Fellow of the Royal Society (1964); Henry Norris Russell Lectureship (1984); Gold Medal of the Royal Astronomical Society (2005) and others
- Scientific career
- Fields: Stellar nucleosynthesis, quasars, galaxy rotation curves

Eleanor Margaret Burbidge, FRS (née Peachey; 12 August 1919 – 5 April 2020) was a British-American observational astronomer and astrophysicist. In the 1950s, she was one of the founders of stellar nucleosynthesis and was first author of the influential B^{2}FH paper. During the 1960s and 1970s she worked on galaxy rotation curves and quasars, discovering the most distant astronomical object then known. In the 1980s and 1990s she helped develop and utilise the Faint Object Spectrograph on the Hubble Space Telescope. Burbidge was also well known for her work opposing discrimination against women in astronomy while also opposing positive discrimination.

Burbidge held several leadership and administrative posts, including director of the Royal Greenwich Observatory (1973–1975), president of the American Astronomical Society (1976–1978), and president of the American Association for the Advancement of Science (1983). Burbidge worked at the University of London Observatory, Yerkes Observatory of the University of Chicago, the Cavendish Laboratory of the University of Cambridge, the California Institute of Technology, and the University of California San Diego (UCSD). From 1979 to 1988 she was the first director of the Center for Astronomy and Space Sciences at UCSD, where she worked from 1962 until her retirement.

== Early life and education ==
Eleanor Margaret Peachey was born in Davenport, Stockport, UK. As a child, Margaret deduced that her birth had been exactly nine months after the Armistice of 11 November 1918 that ended the First World War, so concluded that she was probably conceived when the armistice was announced. She was the daughter of Marjorie Stott Peachey and Stanley John Peachey; her father was a lecturer in chemistry at the Manchester School of Technology (now part of the University of Manchester) and her mother was one of his students. A few years after Margaret was born, Stanley obtained a patent related to the vulcanisation of rubber, which made enough money for the family to move to London in 1921 where he set up his own industrial chemistry laboratory.

Margaret first became interested in astronomy aged 3 or 4, after seeing the stars on a ferry trip across the English Channel. By age 12, she was reading astronomy textbooks by James Jeans, a distant relative of her mother. Burbidge studied at University College London (UCL), where she received an undergraduate degree in 1939 and a PhD in 1943.

== Research career ==
During the Second World War, she acted as a caretaker at University of London Observatory (ULO). Her observations benefitted from unusually dark night skies caused by the wartime blackout. In August 1944, her observations at ULO were twice interrupted by V-1 flying bomb explosions nearby. She was turned down for a postdoctoral fellowship from Carnegie Observatories in 1945 because the job required observing at Mount Wilson Observatory, which was reserved for men only at that time. From 1948-51, she taught astronomy at ULO to undergraduate students from across the University of London system, including Arthur C. Clarke who was then an undergraduate at King's College London.

In 1951 she took a position at the University of Chicago's Yerkes Observatory, Wisconsin, her first job in the United States. Her research during this period focused on the abundances of chemical elements in stars. She returned to the UK in 1953, when Margaret and her husband Geoffrey Burbidge were invited to work with William Alfred Fowler and Fred Hoyle at the University of Cambridge. The team combined data on elemental abundances produced by the Burbidges with Hoyle's hypothesis that all chemical elements might be produced in stars by a series of nuclear reactions, and Fowler's laboratory experiments on those reactions. The idea became known as stellar nucleosynthesis. They published their model in a series of papers, culminating in a magnum opus in 1957, now known as the B^{2}FH paper after the initials of Burbidge, Burbidge, Fowler & Hoyle. Margaret Burbidge was the first author of the paper, which was written while she was pregnant. The paper demonstrated that most heavier chemical elements were formed in stellar evolution. The theory they developed remains the fundamental basis for stellar nucleosynthesis. Fowler was later awarded the 1983 Nobel Prize in Physics (shared with Subrahmanyan Chandrasekhar) for his work on nucleosynthesis, and expressed surprise that Burbidge was not included.

When Fowler moved back to the U.S., he advised the Burbidges to come with him to California, suggesting Margaret (the observer) should re-apply for the fellowship at Mount Wilson Observatory while Geoff (the theorist) should seek the Kellogg Fellowship at Caltech. Margaret's application was again refused on gender grounds, so the couple swapped applications. Geoff won the position at Mount Wilson, while Margaret took the Caltech job in 1955. Whenever Geoff was required to go observing on Mount Wilson, Margaret would accompany him, ostensibly as his assistant. In reality, Geoff worked in the photographic dark room while Margaret operated the telescope. When the observatory's management found out, they eventually agreed that she could observe there, but only if she and her husband stayed in a separate self-catered cottage on the grounds, rather than the catered dormitory which had been designed for men only.

She joined the University of California San Diego (UCSD) in 1962. In the 1960s and 1970s she measured the masses, compositions, and rotation curves of galaxies and performed early spectroscopic studies of quasars. Her discoveries in this area included QSO B1442+101 at a redshift of 3.5, making it the most distant known object at the time, a record which she held from 1974 to 1982. She was a supporter of the steady state theory of cosmology, but her own work on quasars helped to support the alternative Big Bang theory.

At UCSD she helped develop the Faint Object Spectrograph for the Hubble Space Telescope, which launched in 1990. With this instrument, she and her team discovered that the galaxy Messier 82 contains a supermassive black hole at its center. As professor emerita at UCSD she continued to be active in research until the early 21st century. Burbidge authored over 370 research papers.

== Leadership positions ==
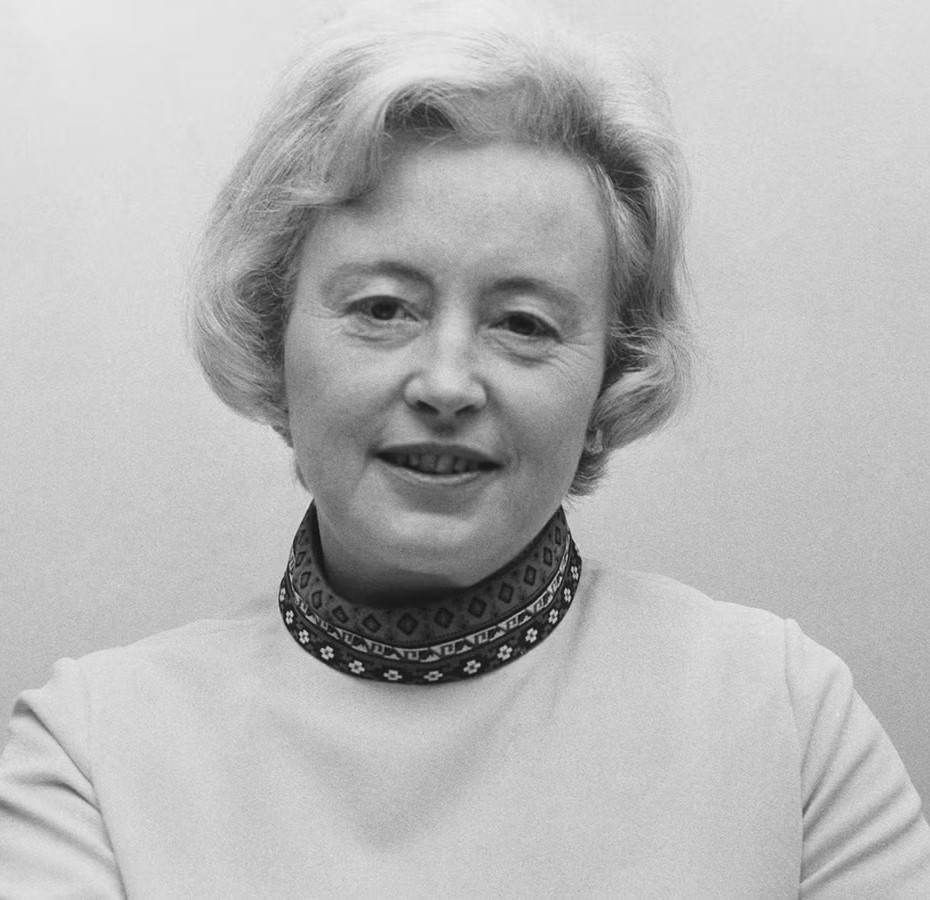
Burbidge pictured in 1971

In 1972 Burbidge became director of the Royal Greenwich Observatory (RGO), on secondment from UCSD. For 300 years the post had always been held by the Astronomer Royal, but in 1972 the positions were split, with Martin Ryle appointed as Astronomer Royal and Burbidge as RGO director. The official explanation was that because Ryle was a radio astronomer, he was unsuitable to lead an optical observatory. Burbidge sometimes attributed the split to sexism, and at other times to politics intended to reduce the clout of the RGO director. Burbidge left the RGO in 1974, fifteen months after joining, due to controversy over moving the Isaac Newton Telescope from RGO headquarters at Herstmonceux Castle to Roque de los Muchachos Observatory in the Canary Islands.

Burbidge campaigned in opposition to discrimination against women in astronomy and was also opposed to positive discrimination. In 1972 she turned down the Annie J. Cannon Award of the American Astronomical Society (AAS) because it was awarded to women only: "It is high time that discrimination in favor of, as well as against, women in professional life be removed". Her letter declining the prize caused the AAS to set up its first committee on the status of women in astronomy. In 1984, the AAS awarded Burbidge its highest honor, regardless of gender: the Henry Norris Russell Lectureship.

In 1976, she became the first female president of the AAS. During her term as president, in 1978 she convinced the AAS council (by six votes to five) to ban meetings in states which had not ratified the Equal Rights Amendment (ERA) to the US Constitution, which would have extended constitutional protection of women's rights. The AAS ban was controversial because it was introduced without consulting the members, many of whom considered it a political issue not related to astronomy. Carl Heiles resigned his AAS membership in protest against the ban, and Elske Smith told Burbidge that the action reduced the chance of the AAS electing another female president. However, many other female AAS members were in favor of the action, including Ann Boesgaard, then the president of the Astronomical Society of the Pacific. Burbidge's successor as president, Ivan King, delayed a resolution to the controversy by establishing a AAS committee to examine the ban and how it was implemented. However the issue became moot when the ERA failed to become law by its deadline of 1982; the AAS quietly dropped its ban in 1984.

From 1979 to 1988, she served as the first director of the UCSD's Center for Astrophysics and Space Science. In 1981 she was elected President of the American Association for the Advancement of Science (AAAS), serving her one-year term from February 1982 to February 1983.

== Personal life ==
On 2 April 1948, Margaret Peachey married Geoffrey Burbidge. The couple had met six months earlier at University College London. Geoffrey was a theoretical physicist, but Margaret's passion for astronomy convinced him to switch to theoretical astrophysics. The two collaborated on much of their subsequent research. The couple had a daughter, Sarah, who was born in late 1956. In 1977, Margaret became a United States citizen. Geoffrey Burbidge died in 2010. Margaret Burbidge died on 5 April 2020, in San Francisco at age 100 after a fall.

== Honors ==
=== Awards ===
- Helen B. Warner Prize for Astronomy, 1959, awarded jointly with Geoffrey Burbidge, for the B^{2}FH paper
- Fellow of the Royal Society, 1964
- Fellow of the American Academy of Arts and Sciences (1969)
- President, American Astronomical Society (1976-1978)
- Karl G. Jansky Lecturer, National Radio Astronomy Observatory (1977)
- Member of the National Academy of Sciences (1978)
- Member of the American Philosophical Society (1980)
- Catherine Wolfe Bruce medal of the Astronomical Society of the Pacific (1982)
- National Medal of Science (1983)
- President, American Association for the Advancement of Science (1983)
- Henry Norris Russell Lectureship (1984)
- Association pour le Développement International de l'Observatoire de Nice (ADION) medal (1987)
- Albert Einstein World Award of Science (1988)
- Inducted into the Women's Museum of California Hall of Fame (2003)
- Gold Medal of the Royal Astronomical Society, with Geoffrey Burbidge (2005)
- Inaugural Fellow of the American Astronomical Society (2020)

=== Named after her ===
- Asteroid 5490 Burbidge
- Margaret Burbidge Award of the American Physical Society
- Burbidge's Chain, a group of galaxies located in Cetus

== See also ==
- Timeline of women in science
