= Stuart Shapiro =

Stuart Shapiro may refer to:

- Stuart S. Shapiro, producer, writer, director, and Internet entrepreneur
- Stuart L. Shapiro (born 1947), American theoretical astrophysicist

== See also ==
- Stewart Shapiro (born 1951), professor of philosophy
