= Kamenev (surname) =

Kamenev (Russian: Ка́менев; masculine) or Kameneva (Ка́менева; feminine) is a common Russian surname. It may refer to:

- Lev Kamenev, Bolshevik revolutionary and a prominent Soviet politician
- Lev Lvovich Kamenev, Russian landscape painter
- Olga Kameneva, Soviet politician, Lev Kamenev's wife and Leon Trotsky's sister
- Sergey Kamenev, Soviet military leader
- Gavriil Kamenev, Russian poet
- Vladislav Kamenev, Russian hockey player
- Alex Kamenev, Russian theoretical physicist
- Lieutenant Kamenev, an antagonist in As Far as My Feet Will Carry Me
- Piotr Ilyich Kamenev, the Premier of the Soviet Union in The Shoes of the Fisherman

== See also ==
- Kamenev Bight
- Kamenev Nunatak
