= Mikhail Voloshin =

Russian and American theoretical physicist (1953–2020)

Mikhail "Misha" Voloshin (May 14, 1953, Bucharest, Romania – March 20, 2020) was a Russian and American theoretical physicist. Voloshin graduated from physics class of Moscow State School 57 in 1970. Voloshin started working at ITEP in 1976 and accordingly earned his Ph.D. in 1977. In 1983 he received a Soviet medal and an award in physics. Beginning in 1990, he taught quantum physics at the William I Fine Theoretical Physics Institute, a division of the University of Minnesota College of Science and Engineering. In 1997 elected a fellow of the American Physical Society. In 2001 he was awarded J.J. Sakurai Prize for Theoretical Particle Physics and in 2004 he was awarded the Alexander-von-Humboldt Award.
