= David Schramm (astrophysicist) =

American astrophysicist (1945–1997)

- Born: October 25, 1945; St. Louis, Missouri, U.S.
- Died: December 19, 1997 (aged 52); Denver, Colorado, U.S.
- Education: California Institute of Technology, Massachusetts Institute of Technology
- Known for: Cosmology, Nucleosynthesis, Dark matter
- Awards: Robert J. Trumpler Award; Lilienfeld Prize (1993)
- Scientific career
- Fields: Astrophysics
- Doctoral students: Nathalie Palanque-Delabrouille, Katherine Freese, Keith Olive

David Norman Schramm (October 25, 1945 – December 19, 1997) was an American astrophysicist and educator, and one of the world's foremost experts on the Big Bang theory. Schramm was a pioneer in establishing particle astrophysics as a vibrant research field. He was particularly well known for the study of Big Bang nucleosynthesis and its use as a probe of dark matter (both baryonic and non-baryonic) and of neutrinos. He also made important contributions to the study of cosmic rays, supernova explosions, heavy-element nucleosynthesis, and nuclear astrophysics generally.

== Biography ==
David Schramm was born in St. Louis, Missouri and earned his master's degree in physics from the Massachusetts Institute of Technology in 1967, where he was also a member of the Delta Upsilon fraternity and the wrestling squad. He earned a Ph.D in physics at Caltech in 1971 under Willy Fowler and Gerry Wasserburg. After a brief time as faculty at the University of Texas at Austin where he also played Prop for the Austin Huns Rugby Club alongside Pat Lochridge, he accepted a professorship at the University of Chicago, where he spent the rest of his career.

Schramm received the Robert J. Trumpler Award of the Astronomical Society of the Pacific in 1974, the Helen B. Warner Prize for Astronomy from the American Astronomical Society in 1978, and he was awarded the Julius Edgar Lilienfeld Prize from the American Physical Society in 1993. He was elected to the National Academy of Sciences in 1986.

Schramm, an avid private pilot, died on 19 December 1997, when his Swearingen-Fairchild SA-226 crashed near Denver, Colorado. He was the sole occupant of the aircraft. The National Transportation Safety Board found the cause to be pilot error. At the time of his death he was vice president for research and Louis Block Distinguished Service Professor in the Physical Sciences at the University of Chicago.

== Legacy ==
The David N. Schramm Award for High Energy Astrophysics Science Journalism was created in his honour in the year 2000 by the High-Energy Astrophysics Division of the American Astronomical Society. The Committee on the Physics of the Universe of the U.S. National Research Council dedicated the 2003 report Connecting Quarks with the Cosmos: Eleven Science Questions for the New Century to the memory of David N. Schramm. Fermilab hosts the David Schramm Fellowship in theoretical or experimental astrophysics. Schramm also leaves a legacy of former graduate students and postdocs, many of whom work in astrophysics around the world, including Brian Fields (professor of astronomy and physics at the University of Illinois), Katherine Freese (professor of physics at the University of Texas at Austin and director of Nordita, the Nordic Institute for Theoretical Physics in Stockholm), Craig Hogan (professor of astronomy and physics at the University of Chicago and director of the Fermilab Center for Astroparticle Physics), James Lattimer (distinguished professor of astronomy, SUNY Stony Brook), Angela Olinto (provost at Columbia University), Keith Olive (director of the William I Fine Theoretical Physics Institute at the University of Minnesota), and many others. Asteroid 113952 Schramm, discovered by the Sloan Digital Sky Survey at Apache Point Observatory in 2002, was named in his memory. The official naming citation was published by the Minor Planet Center on 30 January 2010 (M.P.C. 68449).
