= William I. Fine Theoretical Physics Institute =

Research institute in the University of Minnesota

Coordinates: 44°58′31″N 93°14′4″W

The William I. Fine Theoretical Physics Institute is a research institute in the University of Minnesota College of Science and Engineering. FTPI was largely the work of physics Professor Emeritus, Stephen Gasiorowicz and university alumnus and Twin Cities real-estate developer William I. Fine. The institute officially came into existence in January 1987. FTPI faculty consists of six permanent members: Andrey V. Chubukov, Alex Kamenev, Keith Olive, Maxim Pospelov, Mikhail Shifman, and Boris Shklovskii. The institute has on Oversight Committee consisting of ten members. The Oversight Committee is the board of directors that make decisions concerning the staffing and budgeting of the institute.

The institute is located at the University of Minnesota's Twin Cities campus, in Tate Hall.

== Outreach ==
The Misel Family Lecture Series

The Irving and Edythe Misel Family Lecture Series, hosted by FTPI, invites physicists from around the world to the University of Minnesota to discuss physics with the general public. It is funded by a private donation gift from the Edythe and Irving Misel family. The list of the Misel Lecturers to date is:

- 2006: Frank Wilczek (2004 Nobel Prize in Physics)
- 2007: Leo Kadanoff (1980 Wolf Prize)
- 2008: Jim Peebles (2019 The Nobel Prize in Physics and 1982 Heineman Prize)
- 2009: Helen Quinn (2000 ICTP Dirac Medal)
- 2010: N. David Mermin (2010 Majorana Prize)
- 2011: Roger Blandford (1998 Heineman Prize)
- 2012: John Ellis (2005 IOP Dirac Medal), 2013: Eric Cornell (2001 Nobel Prize in Physics)
- 2014: Andrei Linde (2012 Fundamental Physics Prize)
- 2015: Joseph Polchinski (2008 ICTP Dirac Medal and 2017 Fundamental Physics Prize)
- 2016: John Preskill (member of the National Academy of Sciences)
- 2017: Wendy Freedman (2016 Dannie Heineman Prize for Astrophysics)
- 2018: Nergis Mavalvala (2017 Carnegie Corporation of New York Great Immigrants award recipient and 2014 NOGLSTP LGBTQ Scientist of the Year)
- 2019: Charles Marcus (2018 National Academy of Sciences),
- 2022: Carlos Frenk (2014 Gold Medal of the Royal Astronomical Society.

Visitor Program

FTPI has a worldwide reach. The institute has hosted over 800 individual researchers, from institutions in more than 18 different countries, for working visits of one day to six months.

Workshops

FTPI hosts up to three workshops per year for physicists from around the world. This includes the 2013 CAQCD meeting which was special because it was the tenth meeting in the series. The proceedings of the previous conferences – they are held biannually – reveal the developments of QCD and related theories from the early 1990s. As well as a workshop in October 2000 celebrating 30 years of supersymmetry.

== Awards ==
Current and former faculty members of FTPI have been honored with a number of prizes and awards. Keith Olive is a current Distinguished McKnight University Professor of Physics and was awarded the 2018 Hans Bethe Prize. Former faculty, Leonid Glazman was a McKnight Presidential Endowed Chair. Boris Shklovskii is the recipient of the 1986 Landau Award and the 2019 Oliver E. Buckley Condensed Matter Prize. Former faculty, Arkady Vainshtein and Mikhail Shifman were awarded the 2016 ICTP Dirac Medal and Prize. Andrey V. Chubukov was awarded the 2018 John Bardeen Prize.

Three faculty members have been awarded the Sakurai Prize: former faculty, Arkady Vainshtein (1999), Mikhail Shifman (1999), and Mikhail Voloshin (2001). former faculty, Arkady Vainshtein (2005) and Mikhail Shifman (2013) received the Pomeranchuk Prize. Mikhail Shifman was honored with the Lilienfeld Prize (2006), and elected as Laureate of Les Chaires Internacionales de Recherche Blaise Pascal (2007). Former member Anatoly Larkin was awarded the Fritz London Memorial Prize in Low Temperature Physics (1990), the Hewlett Packard Europhysics Prize (1993), the Lars Onsager Prize in Theoretical Statistical Physics (2002) as well as the Bardeen Prize for Superconductivity (2004).

== Funding ==
The William I. Fine Theoretical Physics Institute is financed from a combination of private and University funds. In the world of fundamental-science research institutes, FTPI is, for its part, something of an oddity. While most such organizations are large, National Science Foundation-funded enterprises, Minnesota's FTPI was created in large part out of the generosity of a single private donor, and it is dedicated to the research efforts of its members.

The United States Department of Energy ER40823 grant is mutually submitted between the Department of Physics at the University of Minnesota and FTPI. This grant is entitled "Experimental and Theoretical High Energy Physics" and helps to support faculty and postdoctoral salaries.

== See also ==
- Institute for Theoretical Physics (disambiguation)
- Center for Theoretical Physics (disambiguation)
