= BSSN formalism =

Formalism of general relativity

The BSSN formalism (Baumgarte, Shapiro, Shibata, Nakamura formalism) is a formalism of general relativity that was developed by Thomas W. Baumgarte, Stuart L. Shapiro, Masaru Shibata and Takashi Nakamura between 1987 and 1999. It is a modification of the ADM formalism developed during the 1950s.

The ADM formalism is a Hamiltonian formalism that does not permit stable and long-term numerical simulations. In the BSSN formalism, the ADM equations are modified by introducing auxiliary variables. The formalism has been tested for a long-term evolution of linear gravitational waves and used for a variety of purposes such as simulating the non-linear evolution of gravitational waves or the evolution and collision of black holes.

== Notation ==
Most references adopt notation in which four dimensional tensors are written in abstract index notation, and that Greek indices are spacetime indices taking values (0, 1, 2, 3) and Latin indices are spatial indices taking values (1, 2, 3).

The superscript (4) is prepended to quantities that typically have both a three-dimensional and a 4-dimensional version, such as the metric tensor for 3-dimensional slices $g_{ij}$ and the metric tensor for the full four-dimensional spacetime ${^{(4)}}g_{\mu \nu}$.

The text uses Einstein notation, where repeated indices indicate summation. For example, if $X \in T_p M$ is a tangent vector on the manifold $M$, and we decompose it into its components, in Einstein notation this would be:

$$\begin{align}
X &= \sum_{\mu} X^{\mu} \dfrac{\partial}{\partial x^{\mu}}
\implies X^{\mu} \dfrac{\partial}{\partial x^{\mu}}
\end{align}$$

The absolute value of the determinant of the matrix of metric tensor coefficients is represented by $g$. Other tensor symbols written without indices represent the trace of the corresponding tensor such as $\pi = g^{ij}\pi_{ij}$.

== Derivation ==
=== Vacuum Solutions ===
Shibata and Nakamura derived the equations for the vacuum solutions:

$$\begin{align}
G_{ab} &= 0
\end{align}$$

==== ADM Formalism ====
Variable	Definition
$\alpha$	lapse function
$\beta^i$	shift vector
$\gamma_{ij}$	metric tensor on a 3D-hypersurface of the foliation
$R$	3D Ricci scalar
$K_{ij}$	extrinsic curvature
$D_i$	3D covariant derivative

The derivation begins with the ADM formalism. The ADM metric is given by:

$$\begin{align}
ds^2 &= -(\alpha^2 - \beta_i \beta^i)dt^2 + 2 \beta_i dt dx^i + \gamma_{ij} dx^i dx^j
\end{align}$$

The Hamiltonian constraint is given by:

$$\begin{align}
R - K_{ij}K^{ij} + K^2 = 0
\end{align}$$

The momentum constraint is given by:

$$\begin{align}
D_i K^i_j - D_j K &= 0
\end{align}$$

and the evolution equations are given by:

$$\begin{align}
\dfrac{\partial}{\partial t} \gamma_{ij}
&= -2\alpha K_{ij} + D_i \beta_j + D_j \beta_i
\end{align}$$

$$\begin{align}
\dfrac{\partial}{\partial t} K_{ij}
&= \alpha(R_{ij} + K K_{ij} - 2 K_{ij}K^{\ell}_j)
- D_i D_j \alpha + (D_j \beta^m)K_{mi} + (D_i \beta^m)K_{mj} + \beta_m D_m K_{ij}
\end{align}$$

== See also ==
- ADM formalism
- Canonical coordinates
- Canonical gravity
- Hamiltonian mechanics
- Numerical relativity
