= Madappa Prakash =

American astrophysicist

Madappa Prakash (born December 28, 1953, in Mysore) is an Indian-American nuclear physicist and astrophysicist, known for his research on the physics of neutron stars and heavy-ion collisions.

== Education and career ==
Prakash grew up in Mysore. At the University of Mysore he graduated with a bachelor's degree in 1971 and a master's degree in 1973. At the University of Bombay (now the University of Mumbai), he received his PhD in 1979 with a dissertation on nuclear fission. From 1974 to 1981, he held a position as a scientific officer at the Bhabha Atomic Research Centre. As a postdoc, he was from 1979 to 1981 on leave of absence for study and research at Copenhagen's Niels Bohr Institute. At the State University of New York at Stony Brook he taught and did research from 1982 to 2005 and collaborated extensively with James Lattimer. From 2005 to the present, Prakash is a professor at Ohio University. In 2020 he and another Ohio University professor became participants in the Network for Neutrinos, Nuclear Astrophysics, and Symmetries (N3AS) Physics Frontier Center, with headquarters at the University of California, Berkeley.

Prakash's research deals with neutron stars and with atomic nuclei and nuclear matter under extreme conditions of density, temperature, and magnetic fields. In 2022, he won the Hans A. Bethe Prize, the most prestigious prize in the field of nuclear astrophysics, for his research about neutron stars and black holes.

Investigations of strangeness-bearing matter led him to discover new pathways to form stellar mass black holes from metastable neutron stars. His work includes the evolution of neutron stars from their birth to old age, neutrino interactions and propagation in dense astrophysical systems, and the theoretical interpretations of the growing number of observations of neutron stars. He develops equations of state, neutrino opacities, and transport characteristics in dense matter for studies of supernovae and binary mergers involving neutron stars and black holes.

In 2001 Prakash was elected a Fellow of the American Physical Society for "fundamental research into the properties of hot and dense matter, providing a basis for understanding relativistic heavy ion collisions and the structure and composition of neutron stars." In 2022 he received the Hans A. Bethe Prize with citation:

For fundamental contributions to the physics of hot and dense matter, and their implications for heavy ion collisions and multi-messenger observations of neutron star structure and evolution.

== Selected publications ==
- Müther, H.; Prakash, M.; Ainsworth, T.L. (1987). "The nuclear symmetry energy in relativistic Brueckner-Hartree-Fock calculations". Physics Letters B. 199 (4): 469–474. Bibcode:1987PhLB..199..469M. doi:10.1016/0370-2693(87)91611-X.
- Prakash, M.; Ainsworth, T. L.; Lattimer, J. M. (1988). "Equation of State and the Maximum Mass of Neutron Stars". Physical Review Letters. 61 (22): 2518–2521. Bibcode:1988PhRvL..61.2518P. doi:10.1103/PhysRevLett.61.2518. PMID 10039146.
- Lattimer, James M.; Pethick, C. J.; Prakash, Madappa; Haensel, Pawel (1991). "Direct URCA process in neutron stars". Physical Review Letters. 66 (21): 2701–2704. Bibcode:1991PhRvL..66.2701L. doi:10.1103/PhysRevLett.66.2701. PMID 10043594. (over 850 citations)
- Prakash, M. (1997). "Composition and structure of protoneutron stars". Physics Reports. 280: 1–77. arXiv:nucl-th/9603042. Bibcode:1997PhR...280....1P. doi:10.1016/S0370-1573(96)00023-3. S2CID 1770109.
- Pons, J. A.; Reddy, S.; Prakash, M.; Lattimer, J. M.; Miralles, J. A. (1999). "Evolution of Proto–Neutron Stars". The Astrophysical Journal. 513 (2): 780–804. arXiv:astro-ph/9807040. Bibcode:1999ApJ...513..780P. doi:10.1086/306889. S2CID 10501821.
- Lattimer, J. M.; Prakash, M. (2001). "Neutron Star Structure and the Equation of State". The Astrophysical Journal. 550 (1): 426–442. arXiv:astro-ph/0002232. Bibcode:2001ApJ...550..426L. doi:10.1086/319702. S2CID 14782250. (over 1700 citations)
- Lattimer, J. M.; Prakash, M. (2004). "The Physics of Neutron Stars". Science. 304 (5670): 536–542. arXiv:astro-ph/0405262. Bibcode:2004Sci...304..536L. doi:10.1126/science.1090720. PMID 15105490. S2CID 10769030. (over 1500 citations)
- Page, Dany; Lattimer, James M.; Prakash, Madappa; Steiner, Andrew W. (2004). "Minimal Cooling of Neutron Stars: A New Paradigm". The Astrophysical Journal Supplement Series. 155 (2): 623–650. arXiv:astro-ph/0403657. Bibcode:2004ApJS..155..623P. doi:10.1086/424844. S2CID 2141379.
- Steiner, A.W.; Prakash, M.; Lattimer, J.M.; Ellis, P.J. (2005). "Isospin asymmetry in nuclei and neutron stars". Physics Reports. 411 (6): 325–375. arXiv:nucl-th/0410066. doi:10.1016/j.physrep.2005.02.004. S2CID 119087712. (over 1000 citations)
- Lattimer, J.; Prakash, M. (2007). "Neutron star observations: Prognosis for equation of state constraints". Physics Reports. 442 (1–6): 109–165. arXiv:astro-ph/0612440. Bibcode:2007PhR...442..109L. doi:10.1016/j.physrep.2007.02.003. S2CID 53523635. (over 1550 citations)
- Page, Dany; Prakash, Madappa; Lattimer, James M.; Steiner, Andrew W. (2011). "Rapid Cooling of the Neutron Star in Cassiopeia a Triggered by Neutron Superfluidity in Dense Matter". Physical Review Letters. 106 (8) 081101. arXiv:1011.6142. Bibcode:2011PhRvL.106h1101P. doi:10.1103/PhysRevLett.106.081101. PMID 21405561. S2CID 423395.
- Lattimer, James M.; Prakash, Madappa (2016). "The equation of state of hot, dense matter and neutron stars". Physics Reports. 621: 127–164. arXiv:1512.07820. Bibcode:2016PhR...621..127L. doi:10.1016/j.physrep.2015.12.005. S2CID 118514019.
- Prakash, Madappa (2014). "Neutron stars as probes of extreme energy density matter". Pramana. 84 (5): 927. arXiv:1404.1966. Bibcode:2015Prama..84..927P. doi:10.1007/s12043-015-0979-7. S2CID 118472033.
- Drischler, Christian; Han, Sophia; Lattimer, James M.; Prakash, Madappa; Reddy, Sanjay; Zhao, Tianqi (2021). "Limiting masses and radii of neutron stars and their implications". Physical Review C. 103 (4) 045808. arXiv:2009.06441. Bibcode:2021PhRvC.103d5808D. doi:10.1103/PhysRevC.103.045808. S2CID 221655657.
