= Donald D. Clayton =

American astrophysicist (1935–2024)

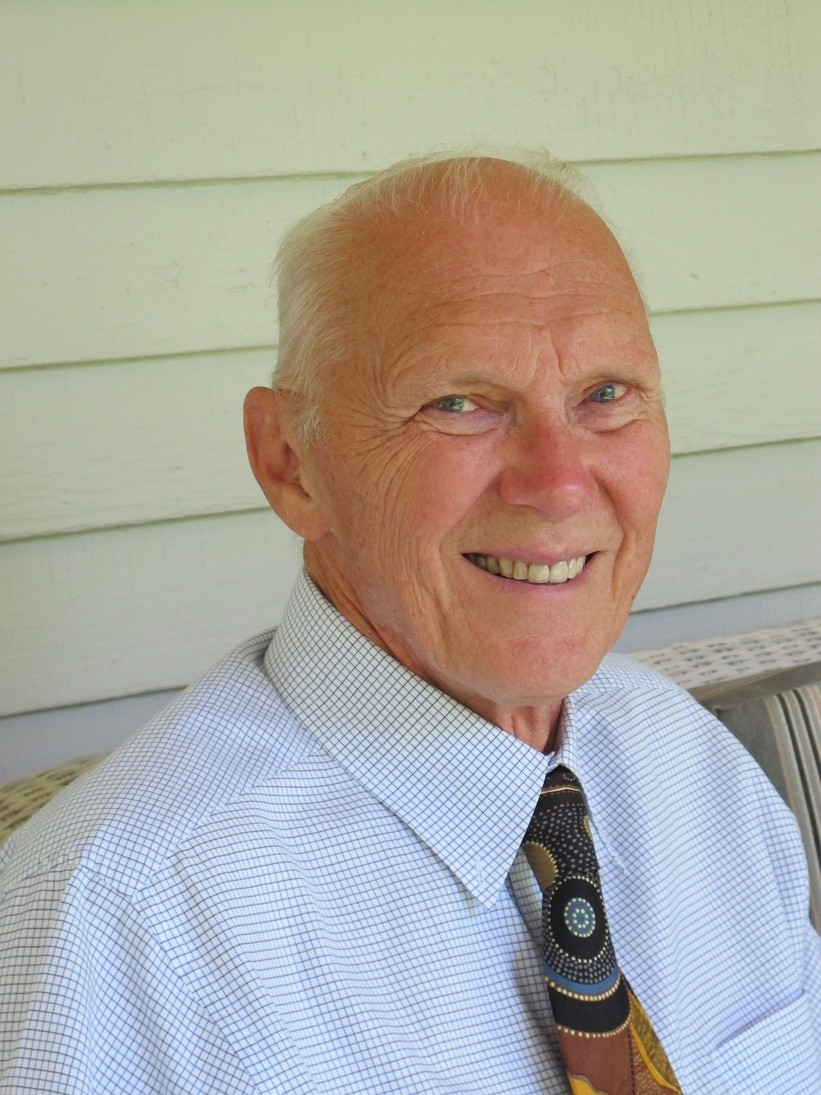
- Clayton in 2012
- Born: March 18, 1935; Shenandoah, Iowa, U.S.
- Died: January 3, 2024 (aged 88)
- Education: California Institute of Technology
- Awards: NASA Exceptional Scientific Achievement Medal, Alexander von Humboldt Award
- Scientific career
- Fields: Astrophysics
- Workplaces: Rice University
- Thesis: Studies of certain nuclear processes in stars (1962)
- Doctoral advisor: William Alfred Fowler
- Doctoral students: Stanford E. Woosley

Donald Delbert Clayton (March 18, 1935 – January 3, 2024) was an American astrophysicist whose most visible achievement was the prediction from nucleosynthesis theory that supernovae are intensely radioactive. That earned Clayton the NASA Exceptional Scientific Achievement Medal (1992) for “theoretical astrophysics related to the formation of (chemical) elements in the explosions of stars and to the observable products of these explosions”. Supernovae thereafter became the most important stellar events in astronomy owing to their profoundly radioactive nature. Not only did Clayton discover radioactive nucleosynthesis during explosive silicon burning in stars but he also predicted a new type of astronomy based on it, namely the associated gamma-ray line radiation emitted by matter ejected from supernovae. That paper was selected as one of the fifty most influential papers in astronomy during the twentieth century for the Centennial Volume of the American Astronomical Society. He gathered support from influential astronomers and physicists for a new NASA budget item for a gamma-ray-observatory satellite, achieving successful funding for Compton Gamma Ray Observatory. With his focus on radioactive supernova gas Clayton discovered a new chemical pathway causing carbon dust to condense there by a process that is activated by the radioactivity.

Clayton also authored a novel, The Joshua Factor (1985), a parable of the origin of mankind utilizing the mystery of solar neutrinos; a science autobiography and a memoir; and a history of the origin of each isotope of the elements from hydrogen to gallium, Handbook of Isotopes in the Cosmos (Cambridge Univ. Press, 2003).

Clayton died on January 3, 2024, at the age of 88.

== Early life and education ==
Clayton was born on March 18, 1935, in a modest rented duplex on Walnut Street in Shenandoah, Iowa, while his parents were temporarily away from both family farms near Fontanelle seeking work during the Great Depression. Clayton spent much of his early childhood on those farms and has rhapsodized over his love of the farm. Clayton attended public school in Texas after his father's new job as co-pilot for Braniff Airlines moved the family to Dallas in 1939. His parents purchased a home in the already renowned Highland Park school system, providing him excellent education. He graduated third in his 1953 class of 92 students from Highland Park High School. Becoming the first among his entire Iowa relations to seek post-high-school education, Clayton matriculated at Southern Methodist University and excelled in physics and mathematics, graduating summa cum laude in 1956.

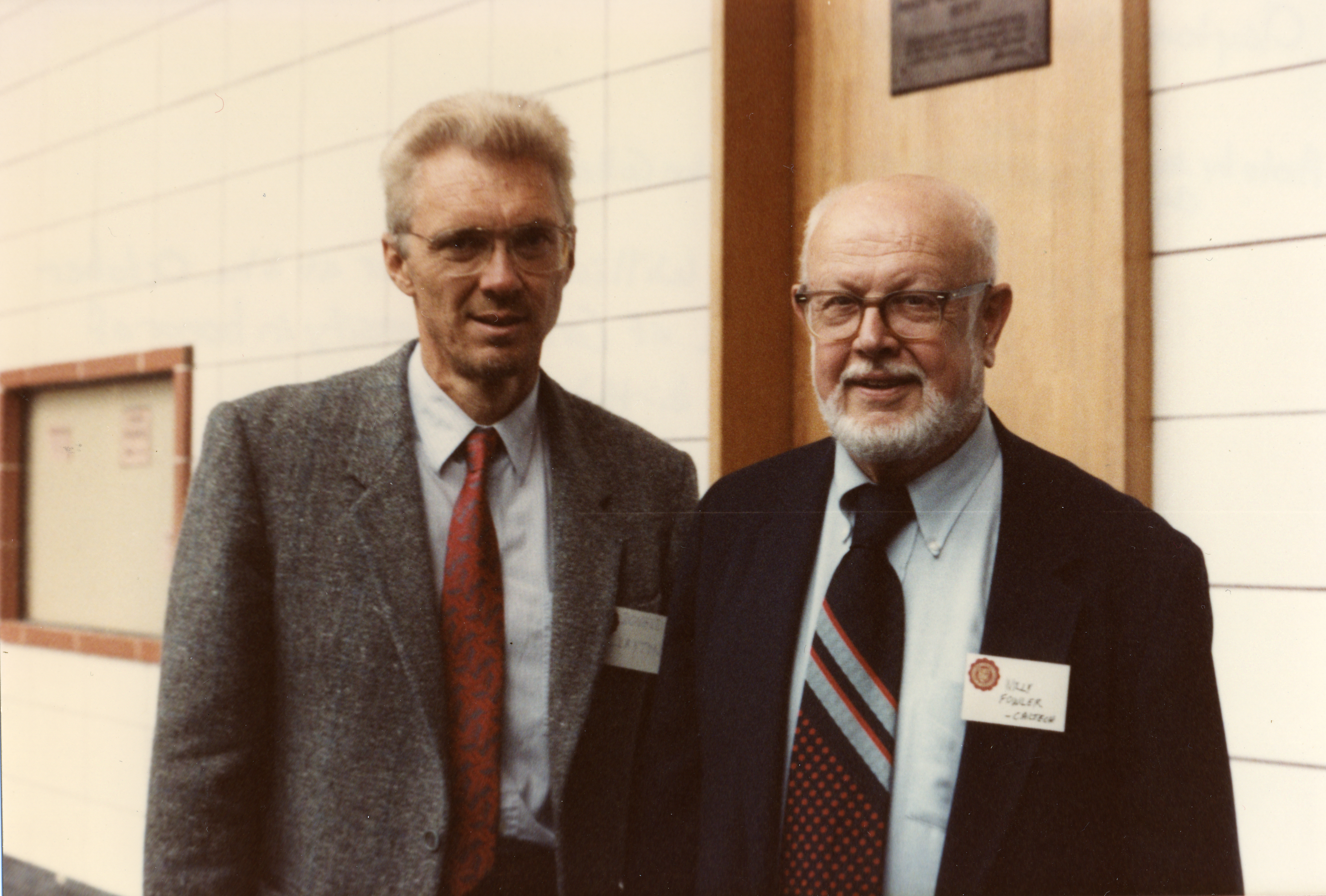
Clayton and Fowler in 1984

At the urging of his SMU professors, he applied as a physics research student to California Institute of Technology (Caltech), which he attended bearing a National Science Foundation Predoctoral Fellowship. In the 1957 nuclear physics course at Caltech Clayton learned from William Alfred Fowler about a new theory that the chemical elements had been assembled within the stars by nuclear reactions occurring there. He was captivated for life by that idea. Clayton completed his Ph.D. Thesis in 1961 on the growth of the abundances of the heavy elements owing to the slow capture of free neutrons (the s process) by more abundant lighter elements in stars. Clayton and his wife Mary Lou played a small role in producing the celebrated Feynman Lectures on Physics by converting the taped audio of Richard Feynman's lectures to prose. Caltech afforded Clayton the chance to meet and later become a lifelong friend of Fred Hoyle, British cosmologist and creator of the theory of nucleosynthesis in stars. Hoyle exerted strong lifetime influence on Clayton. Clayton's published collaborations with Fowler (1983 Nobel Laureate in Physics) as Fowler's research student (1957–60) and subsequently as Fowler's post-doctoral research associate (1961–63) launched Clayton's scientific career.

He established himself at Caltech as a new worker in the field of nucleosynthesis in stars by calculating the first time-dependent models of both the s process and the fast neutron-capture chains of the r process of heavy-element nucleosynthesis and of the nuclear abundance quasiequilibrium that establishes the highly radioactive abundances between silicon and nickel during silicon burning in stars. He came onto the field early, when nucleosynthesis was a vibrant, modern frontier. Citations are in the Nucleosynthesis section below.

== Career ==
A historic connection of Clayton's academic career to NASA's Apollo Program arose through establishment by Rice University of its Department of Space Science in 1963. This action by Rice University provided the academic position assumed by Clayton in 1963. Clayton described this good fortune in his autobiography. His academic research into five fields of astrophysics championed by him is detailed in section 5 below. Foundational academic positions at Caltech, Rice University and Clemson University were augmented by international breadth: seven-year-long academic affiliations in Cambridge (1967–1974) and later in Heidelberg (1976–82), as well as by visiting summer positions in Cardiff UK (1976, 1977) as well as sabbatical leaves in Cambridge (1971), Heidelberg (1981) and Durham University UK (1987).

Following his two-year (1961–63) postdoctoral research fellowship at Caltech, Clayton was awarded an Assistant Professorship, one of the four founding faculty members in Rice University's newly created Department of Space Science (later renamed Space Physics and Astronomy). There he initiated a graduate-student course explaining nuclear reactions in stars as the mechanism for the creation of the atoms of our chemical elements. His pioneering textbook based on that course (Principles of Stellar Evolution and Nucleosynthesis, McGraw-Hill 1968) earned ongoing praise. In 2018, 50 years after its first publication, it is still in common usage in graduate education throughout the world. At Rice Clayton was awarded the newly endowed Andrew Hays Buchanan Professorship of Astrophysics in 1968 and held that endowed professorship for twenty years until responding to the opportunity to guide a new astrophysics program at Clemson University in 1989. During the 1970s at Rice University Clayton guided Ph.D. theses of many research students who achieved renown, especially Stanford E. Woosley, William Michael Howard, H. C. Goldwire, Richard A. Ward, Michael J. Newman, Eliahu Dwek, Mark Leising and Kurt Liffman. Senior thesis students at Rice University included Bradley S. Meyer and Lucy Ziurys, both of whom forged distinguished careers in the subjects of those senior theses. Historical photos of several students can be seen on Clayton' s photo archive for the history of nuclear astrophysics. Clayton followed the historic Apollo 11 mission while on holiday with his family in Ireland while traveling to Cambridge UK for his third research summer there.

Letters in winter 1966 from W.A. Fowler unexpectedly invited Clayton to return to Caltech in order to coauthor a book on nucleosynthesis with Fowler and Fred Hoyle. In his autobiography Clayton quotes these letters. He accepted that offer but the book was never written because while he was resident at Caltech Clayton was invited by Fred Hoyle to Cambridge University (UK) in spring 1967 to advise a research program in nucleosynthesis at Hoyle's newly created Institute of Astronomy. The award to Clayton of an Alfred P. Sloan Foundation Fellowship (1966–68) facilitated leaves of absence from Rice University for this purpose. Clayton exerted that research leadership in Cambridge during 1967-72 by bringing his research students from Rice University with him. That prolific period ended abruptly by Hoyle's unexpected resignation from Cambridge University in 1972. Clayton was during these years a Visiting Fellow of Clare Hall. At Rice University W.D. Arnett, S.E. Woosley, and W.M. Howard published jointly numerous innovative studies with Clayton on the topic of explosive supernova nucleosynthesis. During his Cambridge years, Clayton proposed radioactive gamma-ray-emitting nuclei as nucleosynthesis sources for the field of gamma-ray astronomy of line transitions from radioactive nuclei with coauthors (Stirling Colgate, Gerald J. Fishman, and Joseph Silk). Detection of these gamma-ray lines two decades later provided the decisive proof that iron had been synthesized explosively in supernovae in the form of radioactive nickel isotopes rather than as iron itself, which Fowler and Hoyle had both advocated.

During (1977–84) Clayton resided part-time annually at the Max Planck Institute for Nuclear Physics in Heidelberg as Humboldt Prize awardee, sponsored by Till Kirsten. Annual academic leaves from Rice University facilitated this. There he joined the Meteoritical Society seeking audience for his newly published theoretical picture of a new type of isotopic astronomy based on the relative abundances of the isotopes of the chemical elements within interstellar dust grains. He hoped that such interstellar grains could be discovered within meteorites; and he also advanced a related theory that he called cosmic chemical memory by which the effects of stardust can be measured in meteoritic minerals even if stardust itself no longer exists there. Clayton designated the crystalline component of interstellar dust that had condensed thermally from hot and cooling stellar gases by a new scientific name, stardust. Stardust became an important component of cosmic dust. Clayton has described the stiff resistance encountered from meteoriticist referees of his early papers advancing this new theory. He nonetheless established that research program at Rice University, where he continued guiding graduate-student research on that topic. He and student Kurt Liffman computed a pathbreaking history of survival rates of refractory stardust in the interstellar medium after its ejection from stars; and with student Mark D. Leising computed a propagation model of positron annihilation lines within nova explosions and of the angular distribution of gamma ray lines from radioactive ^{26}Al in the galaxy. Following laboratory discovery in 1987 of meteoritic stardust bearing unequivocal isotopic markers of stars, Clayton was awarded the 1991 Leonard Medal, the highest honor of the Meteoritical Society. Feeling vindicated, Clayton exulted in Nature "the human race holds solid samples of supernovae in its hands and studies them in terrestrial laboratories".

In 1989 Clayton accepted a professorship at Clemson University to develop a graduate research program in astrophysics there. He began this academic segment (1989–present) by hiring three talented young astrophysicists to vitalize joint research with the Compton Gamma Ray Observatory (launched in 1991 after several delays). Its four instruments successfully detected gamma-ray lines identifying several of the radioactive nuclei that Clayton had predicted to be present in supernova remnants. Clayton had been designated ten years earlier co-investigator on the NASA proposal submitted by James Kurfess for the Oriented Scintillation Spectrometer Experiment OSSE, one of the four successful instruments carried into orbit by Space Shuttle Atlantis, and he carried that research contract to Clemson. Simultaneously Clayton developed at Clemson his stardust research, introducing annual workshops for its researchers. The initial NASA-sponsored workshop at Clemson in 1990 was so lively that it was repeated the following year jointly with Washington University in St. Louis cosponsorship, and in later years cosponsored also by the University of Chicago and by the Carnegie Institution of Washington. These workshops featured the excitement of new isotopic discoveries, and also helped participants focus their ideas for submission of abstracts to NASA's Lunar and Planetary Science Conference. Otherwise participants' workshop discussions were not shared or publicized.

Eventually a unique new goal became to assemble from his large personal collection of photographs a web-based archive for the history of nuclear astrophysics and to donate the original photographs to the Center for the History of Physics, a wing of the American Institute of Physics. The thrusts of Clayton's career at Clemson University are well represented on that Photo Archive by photos between 1990 and 2014. Following his retirement from academic duties in 2007, Clayton remained quite active in research problems involving condensation of dust within supernovae and has also published a scientific autobiography, Catch a Falling Star.

== Personal life ==
Clayton married three times: in 1954 in Dallas to Mary Lou Keesee (deceased 1981, Houston) while they were students at SMU; in 1972 in St. Blasien, Germany to Annette Hildebrand (divorced 1981, Houston); and in 1983 in the Rice University Chapel, to the former Nancy Eileen McBride an artist. He had two children with Mary Lou, and one each with Annette and with Nancy.

Clayton resided with Nancy in historic G. W. Gignilliat House (1898) in Seneca, South Carolina. Clayton's mother and father had both been born on family farms in Fontanelle IA to parents who had lived their entire lives on Fontanelle farms. Their own parents had immigrated to Iowa near 1850 from England and Germany. Two of Clayton's great grandfathers (Kembery and Clayton) fought in the Civil War (North). Robert M. Clayton fought in Sherman's Army at the battle of Atlanta.

While at Rice University, Clayton was introduced by patron of the arts Dominique de Menil to Italian filmmaker Roberto Rossellini, and they jointly conceived of a film about one scientist's deepening realizations during a cosmological life, a sequence of experiences which Clayton proposed to provide for that project. In summer 1970 Clayton spent two weeks in Rome working daily with Rossellini on that effort, which failed owing to insufficient financial support or to insufficiently theatrical plan. Clayton's published early memoir The Dark Night Sky: a personal adventure in cosmology laid out his plan for that film.

== Awards and honors ==
- Fellow, American Academy of Arts and Sciences
- NASA Exceptional Scientific Achievement Medal (1992)
- Leonard Medal of the Meteoritical Society (1991)
- NASA Public Service Group Achievement Award for the Oriented Scintillation Spectrometer Team on NASA's Compton Gamma Ray Observatory (1992)
- Jesse Beams Medal of the American Physical Society (1998)
- South Carolina Governor's Award for Excellence in Science (1994)
- Alexander von Humboldt Award (1977 and 1982) sponsored by Max Planck Institut für Kernphysik, Heidelberg
- Author of one of the 50 most influential research papers of the 20th century selected by American Astronomical Society and author in the AAS Centennial Volume

Clayton was elected to Phi Beta Kappa during his third year as a student at Southern Methodist University. He was awarded many supporting fellowships: National Science Foundation Predoctoral Fellow (1956–58); Alfred P. Sloan Foundation Fellow (1966–68); Fulbright Fellow (1979–80); Fellow of St. Mary's College, Durham University (1987); SERC Senior Visiting Fellow, The Open University, Milton Keynes, U.K. (1993). In 1993 Clayton was named Distinguished Alumnus of Southern Methodist University, thirty-seven years after his BS degree there.
