= James Lattimer =

American physicist (b. 1950)

- Born: James Michael Lattimer; April 12, 1950 (age 76); Marion, Indiana; United States
- Education: University of Notre Dame; University of Texas at Austin
- Awards: Hans Bethe Prize (2015)
- Scientific career
- Fields: Nuclear astrophysics
- Workplaces: University of Chicago; University of Illinois at Urbana-Champaign; Stony Brook University
- Doctoral advisor: David Schramm

James Michael Lattimer (born April 12, 1950, in Marion, Indiana) is an American nuclear astrophysicist who works on the equation of state for dense nuclear matter and neutron stars. He is currently a distinguished professor at Stony Brook University.

== Career ==
Lattimer completed his BSc in 1972 at the University of Notre Dame and his PhD in 1976 at the University of Texas at Austin. After postdoc positions at the University of Chicago and University of Illinois at Urbana-Champaign, he became a professor at Stony Brook University in 1979 and a Distinguished Professor of Physics and Astronomy in 2013.

He is also associate editor of the Physical Review Letters.

== Research ==
Lattimer has made several fundamental contributions to the field of nuclear astrophysics, with a particular focus on neutron stars. One of his biggest impacts was modeling the birth of neutron stars from supernovae in 1986 with then-research assistant professor Adam Burrows. This came just six months before the closest supernova in modern history (SN 1987A, in the LMC). Their paper predicted the signature of neutrinos from supernovae that was subsequently validated by neutrino observations, from SN 1987A on February 23, 1987.

In work that led to his PhD thesis, Lattimer and his advisor David Schramm first argued that the mergers of neutron stars and black holes would result in the ejection of neutron-rich matter in sufficient quantities to explain the origin of r-process elements such as gold and platinum. Later, with collaborators, he demonstrated decompressing neutron-star matter from both neutron star-black holes and neutron star-neutron star mergers would form a natural r-process that would match observed patterns. Mass ejection and r-process nucleosynthesis from decompression has been apparently observed in the aftermath of GW170817, the first merger of two neutron stars detected by LIGO/VIRGO. The inferred r-process mass seems sufficient that neutron star mergers are likely the dominant source of these nuclides.

Lattimer and collaborators also proposed that the recently observed rapid cooling of the neutron star in the Cassiopeia A supernova remnant is the first direct evidence for superfluidity and superconductivity in neutron star interiors. He has collaborated extensively with Madappa Prakash.

== Awards and honors ==
In 2015, Lattimer was awarded the Hans Bethe Prize for "outstanding theoretical work connecting observations of supernovae and neutron stars with neutrino emission and the equation of state of matter beyond nuclear density."

In 1985, he was awarded the Fullam (Ernest F.) Award from Dudley Observatory (1985).

Lattimer has been elected to the following fellowships:

- Fellow of American Astronomical Society (2023)
- Fellow of American Physical Society (2001)
- Guggenheim (J.S.) Fellowship (1999)
- Sloan (Alfred P.) Fellowship (1982)
