= James Ricker Wilson =

American physicist (1922–2007)

James "Jim" Ricker Wilson (October 21, 1922, Berkeley, California – August 14, 2007, Livermore, California) was an American theoretical physicist, known for his pioneering research in numerical relativity and numerical relativistic hydrodynamics.

== Biography ==
After graduating in 1942 with a B.S. degree in chemistry from the University of California, Berkeley (UC Berkeley), he served in the U.S. Army, working in a minor role on the Manhattan Project at Los Alamos. After working at Los Alamos from 1944 to 1946 he returned as a graduate student in physics to UC Berkeley. There he received his Ph.D. in 1952. His Ph.D. thesis entitled Some problems in meson theory was supervised by Roland Hamilton Good (1923–2010), who was elected in 1958 a fellow of the American Physical Society (APS). After working for a year from 1952 to 1953 at Albuquerque's U.S. Army Sandia Laboratory, Wilson became in 1953 a staff member of the Lawrence Livermore National Laboratory, where he worked until shortly before his death at age 84. From 1968 to 1969 he spent a sabbatical year at the University of Cambridge, where he began his study of astrophysics. From 1996 to 2007 he was also an adjunct professor of physics at the University of Notre Dame, which he often visited.

In the first two decades of his career he applied his expertise in computational physics to classified projects involving nuclear weapons. In the 1970s and 1980s Hans Bethe often visited Livermore and collaborated with Wilson on core-collapse supernovae.

In 1994 he received the Marcel Grossmann Prize. He was a member of the APS and the American Astronomical Society. In 2007 he received the Hans A. Bethe Prize with citation:

Wilson was an enthusiastic rock climber and mountaineer. In 1947 he met his future wife Demetria "Dee' Corombos (1922–2005) on a rock climbing expedition in Wyoming's Wind River Range, and their love of mountains was "one of their strongest bonds." They were married in February 1949 in a Greek Orthodox Church in Oakland, California. They were members of the Bay Area chapter of the Sierra Club's rock-climbing section and regularly went on local climbs. The couple had five children and annually took a weeklong family backpacking trip in the Sierra Nevada.

Upon his death in 2007 he was survived by five children, seventeen grandchildren, and two great-grandchildren.

James Ricker Wilson should not be confused with James Randall Wilson, who was elected in 2001 a fellow of the APS.

== Selected publications ==
=== Articles ===
- Leblanc, J. M.; Wilson, J. R. (1970). "A Numerical Example of the Collapse of a Rotating Magnetized Star". The Astrophysical Journal. 161: 541–551. Bibcode:1970ApJ...161..541L. doi:10.1086/150558.
- Wilson, J. R. (1971). "A numerical study of gravitational stellar collapse". The Astrophysical Journal. 163: 209–219. Bibcode:1971ApJ...163..209W. doi:10.1086/150759.
- Wilson, James R. (1972). "Numerical Study of Fluid Flow in a Kerr Space". The Astrophysical Journal. 173: 431. Bibcode:1972ApJ...173..431W. doi:10.1086/151434.
- Ruffini, Remo; Wilson, James R. (1975). "Relativistic magnetohydrodynamical effects of plasma accreting into a black hole". Physical Review D. 12 (10): 2959–2962. Bibcode:1975PhRvD..12.2959R. doi:10.1103/PhysRevD.12.2959.
- Bethe, H. A.; Wilson, J. R. (1985). "Revival of a stalled supernova shock by neutrino heating". The Astrophysical Journal. 295: 14–23. Bibcode:1985ApJ...295...14B. doi:10.1086/163343. (over 1200 citations)
- Fuller, G. M.; Mayle, R. W.; Wilson, J. R.; Schramm, D. N. (1987). "Resonant neutrino oscillations and stellar collapse". The Astrophysical Journal. 322: 795. Bibcode:1987ApJ...322..795F. doi:10.1086/165772. S2CID 122113495.
- Wilson, J.; Mayle, R. W. (1988). "Convection in core collapse supernovae". Physics Reports. 163 (1–3): 63–78. Bibcode:1988PhR...163...63W. doi:10.1016/0370-1573(88)90036-1.
- Mayle, Ron; Wilson, James R.; Ellis, John; Olive, Keith; Schramm, David N.; Steigman, Gary (1988). "Constraints on axions from SN 1987A". Physics Letters B. 203 (1–2): 188–196. Bibcode:1988PhLB..203..188M. doi:10.1016/0370-2693(88)91595-X.
- Mayle, Ron; Wilson, James R.; Ellis, John; Olive, Keith A.; Schramm, David N.; Steigman, Gary (1989). "Updated constraints on axions from SN1987A". Physics Letters B. 219 (4): 515–520. Bibcode:1989PhLB..219..515M. doi:10.1016/0370-2693(89)91104-0.
- Wilson, James R.; Mayle, Ronald W. (1993). "Report on the progress of supernova research by the Livermore group". Physics Reports. 227 (1–5): 97–111. Bibcode:1993PhR...227...97W. doi:10.1016/0370-1573(93)90059-M.
- Miller, D. S.; Wilson, J. R.; Mayle, R. W. (1993). "Convection above the neutrinosphere in Type II supernovae". The Astrophysical Journal. 415: 278. Bibcode:1993ApJ...415..278M. doi:10.1086/173163.
- Qian, Yong-Zhong; Fuller, George M.; Mathews, Grant J.; Mayle, Ron W.; Wilson, James R.; Woosley, S. E. (1993). "Connection between flavor-mixing of cosmologically significant neutrinos and heavy element nucleosynthesis in supernovae". Physical Review Letters. 71 (13): 1965–1968. Bibcode:1993PhRvL..71.1965Q. doi:10.1103/PhysRevLett.71.1965. PMID 10054549. S2CID 41193046.
- Woosley, S. E.; Wilson, J. R.; Mathews, G. J.; Hoffman, R. D.; Meyer, B. S. (1994). "The r-process and neutrino-heated supernova ejecta". The Astrophysical Journal. 433: 229. Bibcode:1994ApJ...433..229W. doi:10.1086/174638. (over 1000 citations)
- Wilson, J. R.; Mathews, G. J. (1995). "Instabilities in Close Neutron Star Binaries". Physical Review Letters. 75 (23): 4161–4164. Bibcode:1995PhRvL..75.4161W. doi:10.1103/PhysRevLett.75.4161. PMID 10059835.
- Totani, T.; Sato, K.; Dalhed, H. E.; Wilson, J. R. (1998). "Future Detection of Supernova Neutrino Burst and Explosion Mechanism". The Astrophysical Journal. 496 (1): 216–225. arXiv:astro-ph/9710203. Bibcode:1998ApJ...496..216T. doi:10.1086/305364. S2CID 17121238.
- Fragile, P. Chris; Mathews, Grant J.; Wilson, James R. (2001). "Bardeen-Petterson Effect and Quasi-periodic Oscillations in X-Ray Binaries". The Astrophysical Journal. 553 (2): 955–959. arXiv:astro-ph/0007478. Bibcode:2001ApJ...553..955F. doi:10.1086/320990. S2CID 12603999.
- Wheeler, J. Craig; Meier, David L.; Wilson, James R. (2002). "Asymmetric Supernovae from Magnetocentrifugal Jets". The Astrophysical Journal. 568 (2): 807–819. arXiv:astro-ph/0112020. Bibcode:2002ApJ...568..807W. doi:10.1086/338953. S2CID 118997409.

=== Books ===
- Bowers, Richard L.; Wilson, James R. (1991). Numerical Modeling in Applied Physics and Astrophysics. Boston: Jones and Bartlett. ISBN 0-86720-123-1.
