= Geoffrey Burbidge =

British astronomer

Geoffrey Burbidge FRS
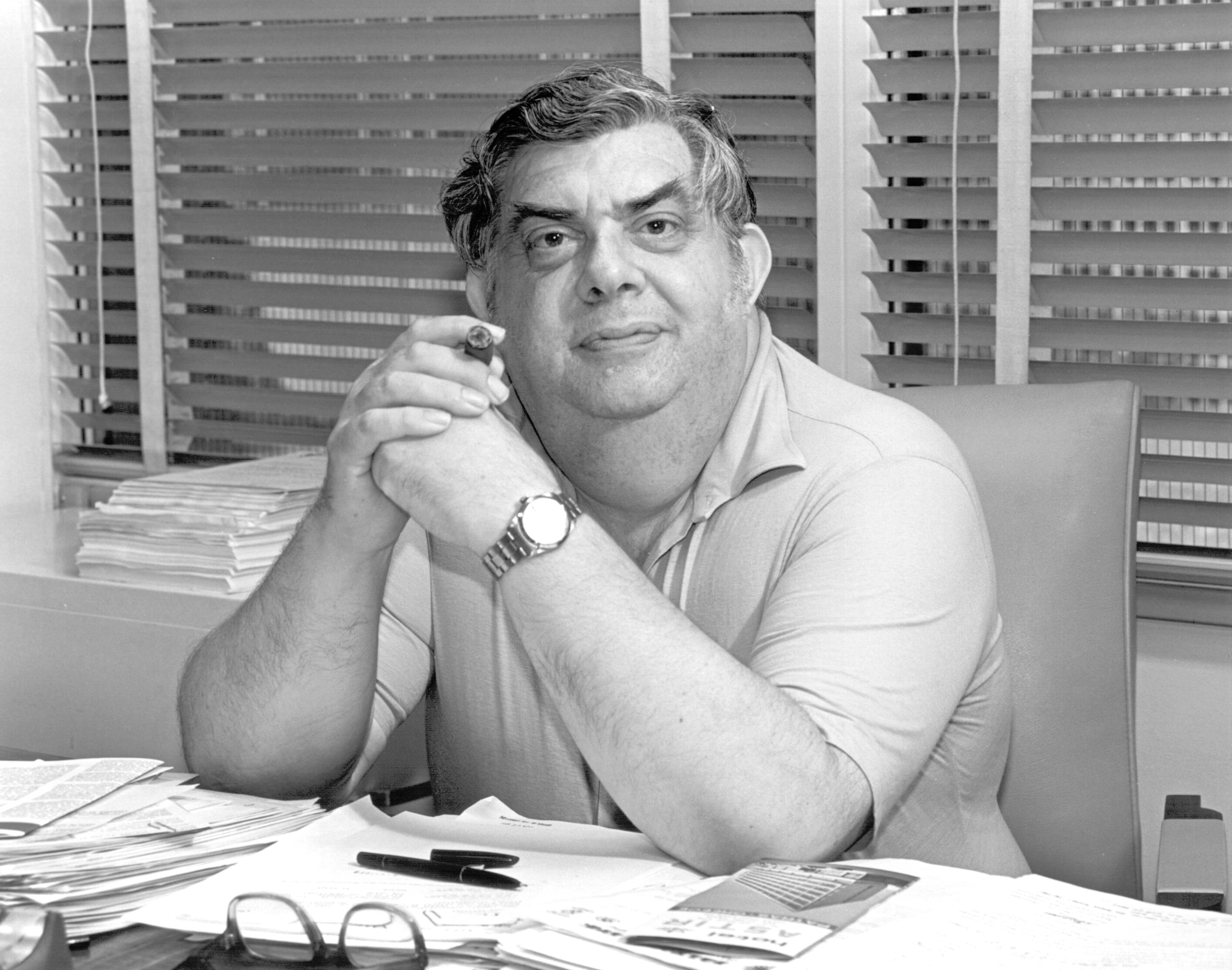
- Born: Geoffrey Ronald Burbidge; 24 September 1925; Chipping Norton, Oxfordshire, U.K.
- Died: 26 January 2010 (aged 84); La Jolla, California, U.S.
- Education: University of Bristol; University College London (PhD)
- Spouse: Margaret Burbidge (m. 1948)
- Awards: Warner Prize (1959); Bruce Medal (1999); Gold Medal of the Royal Astronomical Society (2007); NAS Award for Scientific Reviewing (2007)
- Scientific career
- Fields: Theoretical astrophysics
- Thesis: The interaction between mesons and light atoms (1951)
- Doctoral advisor: H.S.W. Massey
- Website: casswww.ucsd.edu/archive/personal/gburbidge.html

Geoffrey Ronald Burbidge FRS (24 September 1925 – 26 January 2010) was an English astronomy professor and theoretical astrophysicist, most recently at the University of California, San Diego. He was married to astrophysicist Margaret Burbidge and was the second author of the influential B^{2}FH paper which she led.

== Early life and education ==
Burbidge was born in Chipping Norton, Oxfordshire, a small market town in the Cotswolds, where he attended grammar school. His father, also Geoffrey Ronald Burbidge, was a builder.

He first attended the University of Bristol to study history, but changed to physics, receiving his degree in 1946. In 1947, he went to London and received his PhD from University College London (UCL) in 1950. While at UCL he worked with Professor H. S. W. Massey who was then head of the department of mathematics.

== Career and research ==
With his wife Margaret Burbidge he worked at Harvard University, the University of Chicago, and the University of Cambridge, before Margaret obtained work at the California Institute of Technology, while Geoffrey worked at the Mount Wilson Observatory and Palomar Observatory. They both obtained positions at the University of California, San Diego, in 1962. He was the Director of Kitt Peak National Observatory from 1978 to 1984. He was the Editor of the Annual Review of Astronomy and Astrophysics from 1974 to 2004.

=== B^{2}FH ===
In collaboration with American physicist William Fowler and British astronomer Fred Hoyle, he and his wife were co-authors of Synthesis of the Elements in Stars, a fundamental paper on stellar nucleosynthesis published in 1957. It is commonly referred to as the B^{2}FH paper after the initial letters of the four authors' surnames. The paper describes the process of stars burning lighter elements into successively heavier atoms which then are expelled to form other structures in the universe, including other stars and planets.

=== Alternative cosmology ===
In his late years, Burbidge was known mostly for his alternative cosmology "quasi-steady state theory", which contradicts the Big Bang theory. According to Burbidge, the universe is oscillatory and as such, expands and contracts periodically over infinite time.

=== Awards and honours ===
- Warner Prize, with his wife (1959)
- Fellow of the American Physical Society (1988)
- Bruce Medal (1999)
- Gold Medal of the Royal Astronomical Society, with his wife (2005)
- NAS Award for Scientific Reviewing of the National Academy of Sciences (2007)
- The Asteroid 11753 Geoffburbidge is named after him

== Personal life ==
He met Margaret Peachey and they married in 1948.

Burbidge died on 26 January 2010 in La Jolla, California.
