= Stephen Gasiorowicz =

American physicist (1928–2016)

- Born: May 10, 1928; Danzig, currently Gdansk, Poland
- Died: June 3, 2016 (aged 88); Minneapolis, Minnesota, U.S.
- Education: University of California, Los Angeles
- Scientific career
- Fields: High-Energy Physics, Theoretical Physics
- Doctoral advisor: Robert Finkelstein

Stephen George Gasiorowicz (May 10, 1928 – June 3, 2016) was an American theoretical physicist. He was born in Danzig in 1928 (Gdansk, Poland) and graduated from the University of California, Los Angeles in 1952.

From 1952 until 1960, Stephen was employed by Lawrence Berkeley National Laboratory at the University of California, Berkeley, as a research staff member. In 1960 he received an offer of Associate Professorship from the Physics Department of the University of Minnesota, and in 1961 he moved to Minnesota where he stayed for the rest of his life. In 1963 he was promoted to full Professor. Gasiorowicz published over 100 papers on high-energy physics, and several well-known textbooks on the theory of elementary particles, quantum mechanics, and other subjects. Best known are Gasiorowicz’s contributions to quark models of hadrons, theory of glueballs, and QCD confinement. Gasiorowicz was one of the founding fathers of William I. Fine Theoretical Physics Institute. From 1979 to 1986 Gasiorowicz was Vice-President of the Aspen Center for Physics, Aspen, CO, and in 1987-89 the Acting Director of FTPI.

== Biography ==
Stephen Gasiorowicz was born on May 10, 1928, into a Jewish family in Danzig (now Gdansk, Poland). Between 1920 and 1939 Danzig was a semi-autonomous city-state populated to a large extent by ethnic Germans. Stephen’s father was a merchant. With the rise to power of Hitler and Nazis in Germany in 1933 persecution of non-Germans in Danzig increased, and Gasiorowicz’s family had to move to Warsaw. On September 1, 1939, the Second World War began with the invasion of Poland by Germany. The Gasiorowiczes had to flee immediately; the only open route was to the East of Poland, to Lemberg (currently Lviv, Ukraine). A few dozen miles before Lviv the Gasiorowiczes were met by a detachment of the Soviet Army, which occupied the eastern part of Poland.

Stephen Gasiorowicz’s journey to freedom started in 1939 in occupied Poland and ended in 1946 in the United States. It lasted for seven years; through the USSR, Romania, Turkey, Iraq, and India. It was not until he was in India (at that time controlled by Britain; the Polish Government in exile was its ally), that the Gasiorowiczes obtained residence permits. He got his education there; first in a Catholic school and then in a Liceum.

In 1946 the Gasiorowiczes were notified that their application for immigration to the U.S., which they filed before the Second World War, was finally approved. The same year Stephen Gasiorowicz sailed from Calcutta, India to San Francisco, California. He was admitted to UCLA as a physics major; he received his BA degree in 1948 and PhD in 1952. His PhD adviser was Robert Finkelstein, and the topic of his PhD thesis was A non-linear model for the composite π-mesons.

In the 1960s, 70s and 80s Stephen Gasiorowicz acquired a reputation as an excellent lecturer, and was sought after as a visiting professor by major research centers, such as NORDITA (Denmark), DESY (Germany), the University of Tokyo. Gasiorowicz’s legacy in physics education spread worldwide. Generations of physics students studied using the textbooks written by Gasiorowicz, which include Elementary Particle Physics, Quantum Physics, and Physics for Scientists and Engineers. He was a PhD adviser to several prominent physicists, including Stanley Brodsky of SLAC and William A. Bardeen of the Fermilab.

== Selected books ==
- Gasiorowicz, Stephen (1966), Elementary Particle Physics, John Wiley & Sons, ISBN 978-0471292876
- Gasiorowicz, Stephen (2003), Quantum Physics (Third Edition), John Wiley & Sons, Bibcode:2003quph.book.....G, ISBN 978-0471057000
- Gasiorowicz, Stephen (2005), Physics for Scientists and Engineers (Third Edition), Pearson Prentice Hall, ISBN 978-0131420946

== See also ==
- List of textbooks on classical and quantum mechanics
