= Andrey V. Chubukov =

Andrey V. Chubukov is a theoretical physicist, at the William I Fine Theoretical Physics Institute, University of Minnesota, specializing in condensed matter. His speciality is physics of strongly correlated electron systems. Chubukov earned his M.Sci. degree in theoretical physics in 1982 and a Ph.D. in 1985 from Moscow State University.

== Honors and awards ==
Andrey V. Chubukov was elected an Alfred P. Sloan Research Fellow in 1995; a fellow of the American Physical Society in 2003; received the Humboldt Award for Senior U.S. scientists in 2009; The Leverhulme Award in 2012; the Ulam Scholarship from Los Alamos National Laboratory in 2012, the William I. and Bianca M. Fine Chair in Theoretical Physics, 2013 and the John Bardeen Prize in 2018.

== Political positions ==
In February 2022, he signed an open letter by Russian scientists condemning the 2022 Russian invasion of Ukraine. On March 20, he and several other researchers initiated another open letter by physicists of Russian descent, also condemning the invasion and calling for an end to it.

== Publications ==
As of July 2025, Andrey V. Chubukov has written over 300 journal articles and has been cited nearly 26,000 times. His current h-index is 86.
