= Georgeanne R. Caughlan =

American astrophysicist

- Formal portrait at Montana State University, 1964.
- Born: October 25, 1916; Montesano, Washington
- Died: January 3, 1994 (aged 77); Bozeman
- Education: University of Washington, B.S. (1937); Ph.D. (1964)
- Known for: Thermonuclear Reaction Rates
- Scientific career
- Fields: Astrophysics
- Workplaces: Montana State University, Bozeman
- Thesis: On Certain Aspects of Hydrogen and Helium Burning in Stars (1964)

Georgeanne (Jan) Caughlan (née Robertson; 25 October 1916 – 3 January 1994) was an American astrophysicist known for her work on stellar energy generation. Her compilation of experimental data on the rates of nuclear reactions was instrumental in establishing the theory of nucleosynthesis that led to a Nobel Prize for William A. Fowler.

== Life ==
Georgeanne Robertson was born on 25 October 1916, the fourth of five children of George Duncan and Anna (McLeod) Robertson, in Montesano, Washington. She attended the University of Washington where she received a bachelor's degree in physics in 1937.

She married Charles Caughlan, a chemist, in 1936, with whom she had four children. She and Charles divorced in the early 1970s.

After her children grew up, she started her doctoral studies at the University of Washington, receiving her PhD in 1964.

She died on 3 January 1994.

== Career ==
Caughlan joined Montana State University in 1957 as an instructor. Between 1961 and 1963, she was a summer research fellow at Caltech, working with William A. Fowler on stellar energy generation. She became an assistant professor at Montana State University in 1961, proceeding to a full professorship in 1974. Upon her retirement in 1984, she was made Professor Emerita.

=== Energy and nuclear generation in stars ===
In the early 1960s, Caughlan began to collect experimental data on stellar nuclear reactions as part of Fowler's researches into energy generation. She transmitted them in handwritten letters to Fowler. Along with Fowler, Caughlan developed a standard format for the presentation of proton, deuteron and alpha particle reaction rates with nuclei from hydrogen to silicon. Fowler, in particular, recognised Caughlan's studies of stellar structure and the theoretical impetus from her that led to his Nobel Prize in Physics in 1983.

The compilations of astrophysical nuclear data by Caughlan (along with Barbara Zimmerman and Fowler) were published periodically, and were considered the 'bible' of nuclear astrophysics.

During Caughlan's stint at Caltech, the first computations of the structure and evolution of stars became possible as computers developed to sufficient power. A computer program developed by Robert V. Wagoner to simulate the synthesis of 41 nuclei in stars required astrophysical rates from Caughlan's work.

=== CNO cycle ===
The carbon-nitrogen-oxygen (CNO) cycle is a process in stellar fusion that converts hydrogen to helium. In 1965, Caughlan computed that if a star exceeds thirty solar masses, the CNO cycle would result in nitrogen atoms outnumbering carbon and oxygen by a factor of 100. The star eta Carinae was determined to be in its final stages of life based on the observation of such nitrogen excess: its spectrum shows nitrogen lines but no oxygen lines.

== Selected works ==
- Caughlan, G.R.; Fowler, W.A. (1964). "Combined Hydrogen and Helium Burning in the Core of a Population II Red Giant Star". Astrophysical Journal. 139: 1180. Bibcode:1964ApJ...139.1180C. doi:10.1086/147859.
- Caughlan, G.R.; Fowler, W.A.; Talbot, R.J. (1964). "Computer Results on Combined Hydrogen and Helium Burning". Astrophysical Journal. 140: 380. Bibcode:1964ApJ...140..380C. doi:10.1086/147930.
- Fowler, W.A.; Caughlan, G.R.; Zimmerman, B.A. (1967). "Thermonuclear Reaction Rates, I". Annual Review of Astronomy and Astrophysics. 5: 525. Bibcode:1967ARA&A...5..525F. doi:10.1146/annurev.aa.05.090167.002521.
- Fowler, W.A.; Caughlan, G.R.; Zimmerman, B.A. (1975). "Thermonuclear Reaction Rates, II". Annual Review of Astronomy and Astrophysics. 13: 69. Bibcode:1975ARA&A..13...69F. doi:10.1146/annurev.aa.13.090175.000441.
- Caughlan, G.R. (1977). "The CNO Cycles". In Audouze J. (ed.). CNO Isotopes in Astrophysics. CNO Isotopes in Astrophysics. Astrophysics and Space Science Library (A Series of Books on the Recent Developments of Space Science and of General Geophysics and Astrophysics Published in Connection with the Journal Space Science Reviews). Astrophysics and Space Science Library. Vol. 67. Dordrecht: Springer. pp. 121–131. doi:10.1007/978-94-010-1232-4_17. ISBN 978-94-010-1234-8.

== Bibliography ==
- Zimmerman, Barbara A. (1998). "Obituary: Georgeanne (Jan) Caughlan, 1916-1994". Bulletin of the American Astronomical Society. 30 (4): 1456. Bibcode:1998BAAS...30.1456Z.
- Fowler, William A. (1994). "Georgeanne Robertson Caughlan". Physics Today. 47 (10): 88. Bibcode:1994PhT....47j..88F. doi:10.1063/1.2808684.
- "Charles Caughlan 1915 - 2013". Bozeman Daily Chronicle. 5 May 2013.
- "Most luminous star has only millennia to live". New Scientist. 94 (1305). 13 May 1982.
- Wagoner, R.V. (1990). "Deciphering the nuclear ashes of the early universe: a personal perspective". In B. Bertotti; R. Balbinot; S. Bergia; A. Messina (eds.). Modern Cosmology in Retrospect. Cambridge University. ISBN 9780521372138.
- Shaviv, Giora (2012). The Synthesis of the Elements: The Astrophysical Quest for Nucleosynthesis and What It Can Tell Us About the Universe. Springer. ISBN 9783642283857.
