= Fiona A. Harrison =

American astrophysicist

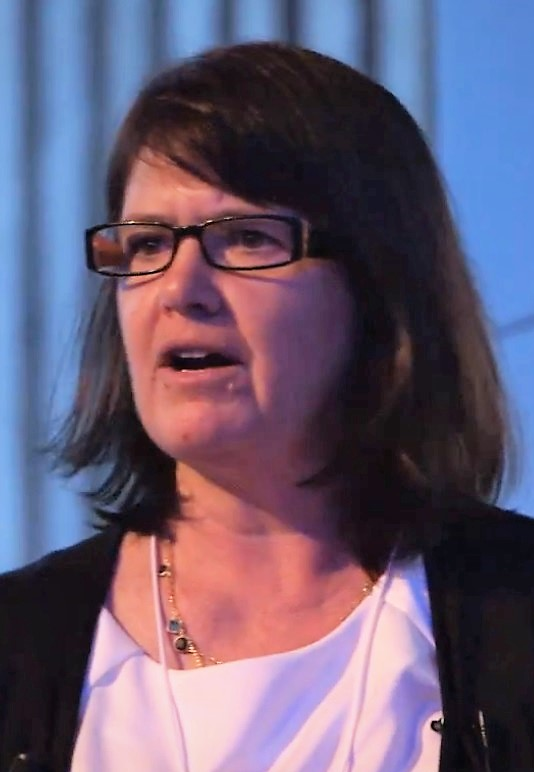
- Harrison speaks at the 2016 World Economic Forum
- Born: Santa Monica, California, US
- Education: Dartmouth College; UC Berkeley
- Awards: Presidential Early Career Award (2000); Bruno Rossi Prize (2015); Hans Bethe Prize (2020); Mohler Prize (2022)
- Scientific career
- Fields: Astrophysics
- Website: pma.divisions.caltech.edu/people/fiona-a-harrison

Fiona A. Harrison is an American astrophysicist. She is the Kent and Joyce Kresa Leadership Chair of the Division of Physics, Mathematics and Astronomy at Caltech, Harold A. Rosen Professor of Physics at Caltech and the Principal Investigator for NASA's Nuclear Spectroscopic Telescope Array (NuSTAR) mission. She won the Hans A. Bethe Prize in 2020 for her work on NuSTAR.

== Biography ==
Harrison was born in Santa Monica, California but moved to Boulder, Colorado, at age three. She completed her undergraduate degree from Dartmouth College in 1985 with high honors in physics, and went to U.C. Berkeley for graduate studies, completing a PhD in 1993. She then went to Caltech as a Millikan Fellow, joining the faculty as an Assistant Professor of Physics in 1995. She became a full professor in 2005 and was appointed as the Benjamin M. Rosen Professor of Physics in 2013.

== Research ==
Harrison's research combines the development of new instrumentation with observational work focused on high energy observations of black holes, neutron stars, gamma-ray bursts and supernova remnants. She was the first author on a paper studying jet breaks in GRB 99051. In this paper, the discovery that GRBs are beamed, which was previously unknown, is delineated. As the Principal Investigator for NuSTAR, the first focusing telescope in orbit operating in the high energy part of the X-ray spectrum (3 – 79 keV), she led an international team to propose, develop and launch the mission. The focal plane detectors and instrument electronics were built in Harrison's labs at Caltech. She led the science team executing the two-year baseline mission, which extended from August 2012 – August 2014.

Harrison's observational research showed that the afterglows of gamma-ray bursts exhibit breaks in their decay rate due to collimation of the ejecta. Scientific highlights from the NuSTAR mission include mapping the radioactive debris in the Cassieopeia A supernova remnant to constrain the core collapse explosion mechanism, measurement of the spin of supermassive and stellar mass black holes, the discovery of a magnetar in the Galactic Center, and the discovery of an ultra luminous pulsar.

== Awards and honors ==
Harrison was awarded the Presidential Early Career award by President Clinton in 2000, was named one of America's best leaders by U.S. News and the Kennedy School of Government, was awarded a NASA Outstanding Public Leadership medal in 2013, and the Bruno Rossi Prize of the American Astronomical Society in 2015. She is a fellow of the American Physical Society, the American Academy of Arts and Sciences, an honorary fellow of the Royal Astronomical Society, and honorary degree Doctor Technices Hornoris Causa from the Danish Technical University, and a member of the National Academy of Sciences.

She was elected a Legacy Fellow of the American Astronomical Society in 2020.

She was awarded the Mohler Prize from the University of Michigan in 2022.

== See also ==
- List of women in leadership positions on astronomical instrumentation projects
