= Keith Olive =

American theoretical physicist (born 1956)

Keith Alison Olive
- Born: October 28, 1956 (age 69); Chicago, United States
- Education: University of Chicago
- Awards: Hans A. Bethe Prize 2018
- Scientific career
- Fields: Cosmology, Big Bang nucleosynthesis
- Workplaces: University of Minnesota
- Doctoral advisor: David Schramm

Keith Alison Olive (born 1956) is an American theoretical physicist, and director at the William I Fine Theoretical Physics Institute, University of Minnesota, specializing in particle physics and cosmology. His main topics of research are: big bang nucleosynthesis, which is an explanation of the origin of the light element isotopes through ^{7}Li; particle dark matter; big bang baryogenesis, which is an explanation of the matter-antimatter asymmetry observed in nature; and inflation which is a theory constructed to resolve many outstanding problems in standard cosmology.

== Education and career ==
Olive received in 1978 a bachelor's degree in mathematics from the University of Chicago and a master's degree in physics in the same year and in 1981 a PhD in physics. His dissertation dealt with cosmology and particle physics. In 1982/83 he was at CERN (working with John Ellis). There Olive began his research on supersymmetry.

Olive is a professor at the University of Minnesota, where in 1998 he became McKnight University Professor. At the Fine Theoretical Physics Institute, he was the director from 1999 to 2005 and again from 2013 to 2019.

== Honors and awards ==
Olive was the 2018 Hans A. Bethe Prize Recipient; elected a fellow of the American Physical Society in 2003; awarded the National Science Foundation Young Investigator Award for the years 1987–1994; elected University of Minnesota Distinguished McKnight Professor 1998–present; and granted the George W. Taylor Award for distinguished Research in 1988 by the College of Science and Engineering at the University of Minnesota.

== Publications ==
He is one of the editors of a book, Inner Space/Outer Space, The University of Chicago Press (1986) and a number of journal articles. His most cited article, cited 2,357 times according to Google Scholar is "Supersymmetric relics from the big bang".
