= Thomas W. Baumgarte =

German physicist

- Born: 1966 (age 59–60); Lucerne
- Education: LMU Munich
- Known for: BSSN formalism
- Spouse: Karen Topp
- Children: Dublin Baumgarte-Topp
- Scientific career
- Fields: Numerical relativity
- Workplaces: Bowdoin College; University of Illinois at Urbana-Champaign

Thomas W. Baumgarte (born 1966) is a German physicist specializing in the numerical simulation of compact objects in general relativity.

== Career ==
Baumgarte completed his BSc in 1992 at LMU Munich and his PhD in 1995 also at LMU Munich. He worked as a postdoc at Cornell University and University of Illinois and is currently a professor of physics at Bowdoin College. He is the author of over 65 articles about general relativity and astrophysics (for example, black holes, neutron stars, and gravitational collapse). In 2010, along with Stuart L. Shapiro, he published a book on numerical relativity. In 2012, he received the Bessel Prize.

== Personal life ==
Baumgarte is married to Karen Topp, who is also a professor at Bowdoin College.
