= University of Minnesota College of Science and Engineering =

Coordinates: 44°58′31.0″N 93°14′10.7″W

- Motto: Inventing Tomorrow
- Type: Public
- Established: 1935
- Dean: Andrew G. Alleyne
- Faculty: 427 tenured and tenure-track faculty members
- Students: 8,184 (5,602 undergraduates, 2,582 graduate students)
- Undergraduates: 5,602
- Location: Minneapolis, Minnesota, U.S.
- Campus: Urban
- Website: cse.umn.edu

The College of Science and Engineering (CSE) is one of the colleges of the University of Minnesota in Minneapolis, Minnesota. On July 1, 2010, the college was officially renamed from the Institute of Technology (IT). It was created in 1935 by bringing together the university's programs in engineering, mining, architecture, and chemistry. Today, CSE contains 12 departments and 24 research centers that focus on engineering, the physical sciences, and mathematics.

== Rankings ==
The programs offered by the College of Science and Engineering are rated among the best in the nation, particularly in Chemical Engineering, Environmental Engineering, Aerospace Engineering, Mathematics, and Mechanical Engineering.

== Departments ==
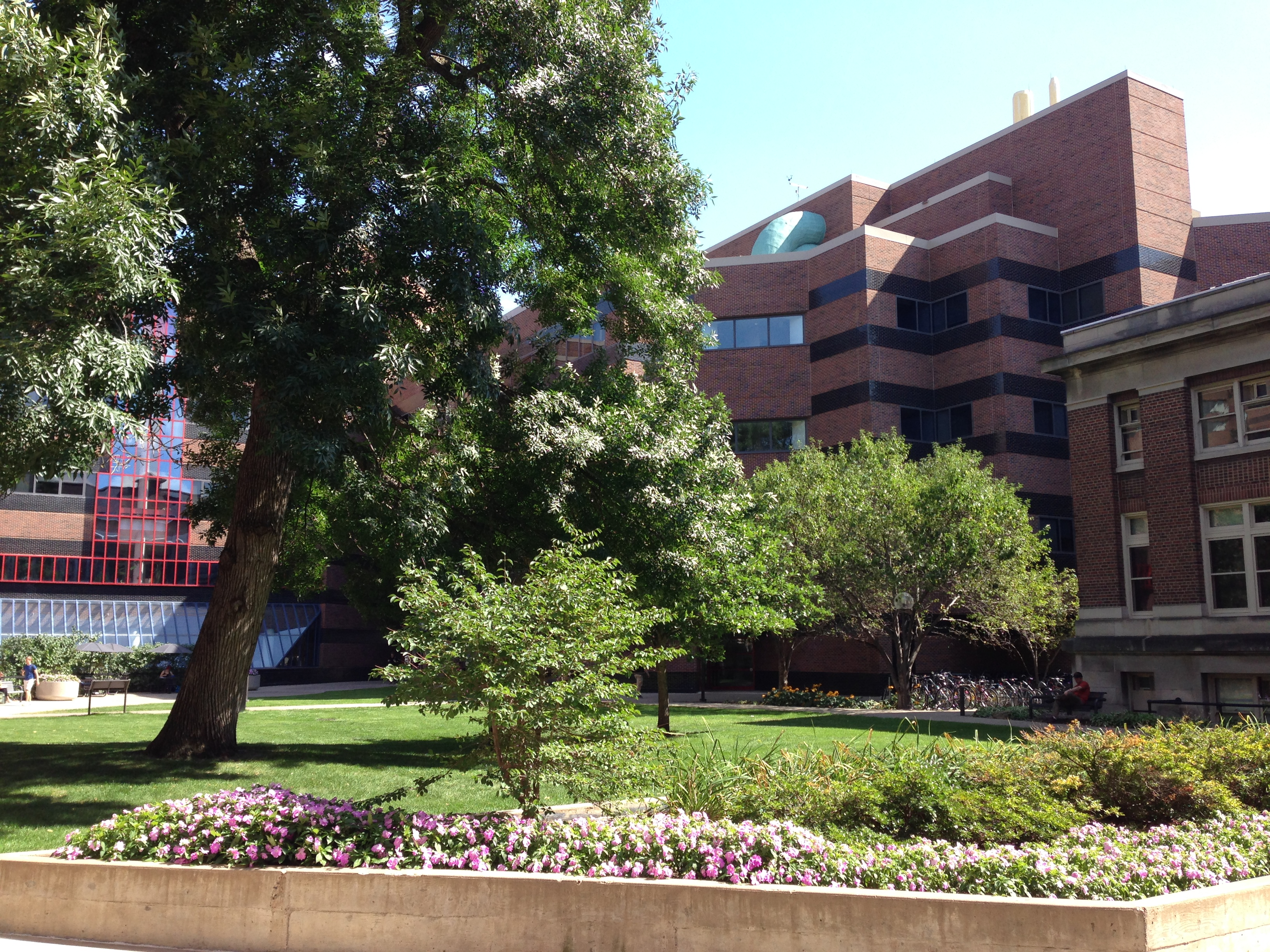
Keller Hall (formerly named EE/CS building)

- Aerospace Engineering and Mechanics
- Biomedical Engineering
- Chemical Engineering and Materials Science
- Chemistry
- Civil, Environmental, and Geo- Engineering
- Computer Science and Engineering
- Earth and Environmental Sciences (formerly called Geology and Geophysics)
- Electrical and Computer Engineering
- Industrial and Systems Engineering
- Mathematics
- Mechanical Engineering
- Physics and Astronomy
- Additionally, CSE pairs with other departments at the University to offer a degree-granting program in Bioproducts and Biosystems Engineering, with CFANS (formerly two departments: Biosystems and Agricultural Engineering, and Bio-based Products)
- And two other CSE units grant advanced degrees:
  - Technological Leadership Institute (formerly Center for the Development of Technological Leadership)
  - History of Science and Technology

== Research centers ==
- BioTechnology Institute
- Center for Transportation Studies
- Characterization Facility
- Charles Babbage Institute - CBI website
- GroupLens Center for Social and Human-Centered Computing
- Industrial Partnership for Research in Interfacial and Materials Engineering
- Institute for Mathematics and its Applications
- Minnesota Nano Center
- Networking Research Group
- NSF Engineering Research Center for Compact and Efficient Fluid Power
- NSF Materials Research Science and Engineering Center
- NSF Multi-Axial Subassemblage Testing (MAST) System
- NSF National Center for Earth-surface Dynamics (NCED)
- Polar Geospatial Center
- Small Satellite Research Laboratory
- St. Anthony Falls Laboratory (SAFL)
- University of Minnesota Supercomputing Institute
- William I. Fine Theoretical Physics Institute

== Educational centers ==
- History of Science and Technology
- School of Mathematics Center for (K-12) Educational Programs
- Technological Leadership Institute
- UNITE Distributed Learning
