= Stuart L. Shapiro =

American theoretical astrophysicist (born 1947)

- Born: Stuart Louis Shapiro; December 6, 1947 (age 78); New Haven, Connecticut, U.S.
- Citizenship: American
- Education: Harvard University; Princeton University
- Known for: BSSN formalism
- Awards: Hans Bethe Prize 2017
- Scientific career
- Fields: numerical relativity, black holes, neutron stars
- Workplaces: University of Illinois at Urbana-Champaign; Cornell University
- Thesis: Accretion onto black holes: the emergent radiation spectrum (1973)
- Doctoral advisor: Jim Peebles

Stuart Louis Shapiro (born December 6, 1947, in New Haven, Connecticut) is an American theoretical astrophysicist, who works on numerical relativity with applications in astrophysics, specialising in compact objects such as neutron stars and black holes.

== Career ==
Shapiro studied at Harvard University and graduated with a BSc. in 1969, completed his Master's degree in 1971 at Princeton, and completed his PhD in 1973. He became a professor in 1975 at Cornell University. In 1996 he became a professor of physics and astrophysics at University of Illinois at Urbana-Champaign. He is an expert in the numerical simulation of astrophysical phenomena in general relativity and has written two standard works on the subject.

In 1979 he was a Sloan Fellow and in 1989 became a Guggenheim Fellow. In 1998 he became a Fellow of the American Physical Society. In 2017, he received the Hans A. Bethe Prize for his seminal and sustained contributions to understanding physical processes in compact object astrophysics, and advancing numerical relativity.

== Research ==
His research concerns the physics of black holes and neutron stars, gravitational collapse and the development of black holes, gravitational waves from the inspiral of neutron stars and black holes in binary systems, the dynamics of large N-body, cosmological questions (big bang nucleosynthesis), and neutrino astrophysics. He has simulated the spectrum of the radiation that develops when gas from an accretion disk falls onto a black hole or neutron star and the destruction and swallowing up of stars by a supermassive black hole in the galaxy. Additionally, the collision and merging of black holes and the development of black holes in galaxies from a relativistic, shock-free gas and the collapse of an unstable relativistic cluster. He showed that toroidal black holes as a transient state in gravitational collapse can develop and that the possibility for the development of a naked singularity exists in the collision of shock-free matter from otherwise normal initial conditions, which violates the cosmic censorship hypothesis.

He has also worked on the detection of gravitational wave signals and their observation in gravitational wave detectors such as LIGO.

== Personal life ==
He has been married since 1971 and has a son and a daughter.

== Publications (selection) ==
- with Thomas W. Baumgarte: Numerical Relativity. Solving Einstein’s Equations on the Computer. Cambridge University Press, 2010. ISBN 978-0-521-51407-1
- with Saul A. Teukolsky: Black Holes, White Dwarfs, and Neutron Stars: The Physics of Compact Objects. Wiley, 1983. ISBN 978-0471873167
  - Shapiro, Stuart L.; Teukolsky, Saul A. (November 20, 2008). Black Holes, White Dwarfs, and Neutron Stars: The Physics of Compact Objects. John Wiley & Sons. ISBN 978-3-527-61767-8. (e-book)
- editor with Teukolsky: Highlights of Modern Astrophysics. Concepts and Controversies. (Conference at Cornell University, 1984), Wiley, 1986. ISBN 978-0471824213
- Shapiro, Teukolsky: Black Holes, Naked Singularities and the Violation of Cosmic Censorship, American Scientist, vol. 79, 1991, pp. 330–343 JSTOR 29774425
- Shapiro, Stuart L.; Teukolsky, Saul A. (February 25, 1991). "Formation of naked singularities: The violation of cosmic censorship". Physical Review Letters. 66 (8): 994–997. Bibcode:1991PhRvL..66..994S. doi:10.1103/PhysRevLett.66.994. ISSN 0031-9007. PMID 10043968.
