= Alex Kamenev =

Russian theoretical physicist

Alex Kamenev is a theoretical physicist, at the William I Fine Theoretical Physics Institute, University of Minnesota, specializing in condensed matter. Kamenev's current research focuses on theoretical condensed matter physics, disordered systems and glasses, field-theoretical treatment of many-body systems, mesoscopic systems, out of equilibrium systems. Kamenev earned his M.Sci. degree theoretical physics, in 1987 from Moscow State University and a Ph.D. in solid-state physics, in 1996 from Weizmann Institute of Science in Israel.

== Honors and awards ==
Kamenev was elected a fellow of the American Physical Society in 2013; elected an Alfred P. Sloan Research Fellow from 2004 to 2008; and was awarded the McKnight Land-Grant Professorship for the years of 2005–2007.

== Publications ==
He is the author of a book, Field Theory of Non-Equilibrium Systems, Cambridge University Press (2011) and a number of journal articles. His most cited article, cited 589 times according to Google Scholar is Boris L. Altshuler, Yuval Gefen, Alex Kamenev, and Leonid S. Levitov "Quasiparticle Lifetime in a Finite System: A Nonperturbative Approach" published in 2003 in vol. 78 of Physical Review Letters
