= Hans A. Bethe Prize =

- Awarded for: Outstanding work in the areas of astrophysics, nuclear physics, nuclear astrophysics, or closely related fields
- Country: United States
- Presented by: Division of Plasma Physics, American Physical Society
- First award: 1998
- Website: www.aps.org/programs/honors/prizes/bethe.cfm

The Hans A. Bethe Prize, is presented annually by the American Physical Society. The prize honors outstanding work in theory, experiment or observation in the areas of astrophysics, nuclear physics, nuclear astrophysics, or closely related fields. The prize consists of $10,000 and a certificate citing the contributions made by the recipient.

Hans Bethe prize is endowed by contributions from the Division of Astrophysics, the Division of Nuclear Physics and friends of the Nobel laureate Hans A. Bethe to honor him for his outstanding and numerous accomplishments in both astrophysics and nuclear physics.

The prize has been awarded annually since 1998.

== Prize recipients ==
- 2026 – Chris Fryer: "For broad and pioneering contributions to our understanding of stellar collapse, supernovae, and compact object formation, and for leadership in the field of time-domain multi-messenger nuclear astrophysics."
- 2025 – A. Baha Balantekin: "For seminal contributions to neutrino physics and astrophysics — especially the neutrino flavor transformation problem — both for solar neutrinos and the nonlinear supernova environment."
- 2024 – J. Richard Bond: "For developing conceptual and quantitative tools that have enabled cosmologists to measure the geometry, content and age of the universe."
- 2023 – Frank Paul Calaprice: "For pioneering work on large-scale ultra-low-background detectors, specifically Borexino, measuring the complete spectroscopy of solar neutrinos, culminating in observation of CNO neutrinos, thus experimentally proving operation of all the nuclear-energy driving reactions of stellar evolution."
- 2022 – Madappa Prakash: "For fundamental contributions to the physics of hot and dense matter, and their implications for heavy ion collisions and multi-messenger observations of neutron star structure and evolution."
- 2021 – James W. Truran: "For distinguished contributions across the breadth of nuclear astrophysics, Galactic chemical evolution and cosmochronology."
- 2020 – Fiona A. Harrison: "For pioneering work in conceiving and executing the first focusing telescope in the high energy X-ray regime, NASA’s Nuclear Spectroscopic Telescope Array (NuSTAR) satellite. NuSTAR has enabled major advances in understanding phenomena in the most extreme environments in the universe."
- 2019 – Ken'ichi Nomoto: "For lasting contributions to our understanding of the nuclear astrophysics of the universe, including stellar evolution, the synthesis of new elements, the theory of core-collapse and thermonuclear supernovae, and gamma-ray bursts."
- 2018 – Keith Olive: "For outstanding contributions across a broad spectrum of fields including nuclear physics, particle physics, theoretical and observational astrophysics, and cosmology, especially Big Bang nucleosynthesis and the properties of dark matter."
- 2017 – Stuart L. Shapiro: "For seminal and sustained contributions to understanding physical processes in compact object astrophysics, and advancing numerical relativity."
- 2016 – Vassiliki Kalogera: "For key contributions to the study of the electromagnetic and gravitational wave radiation from binary compact objects, including the now-verified prediction that neutron star mergers produce short gamma-ray bursts that will be found in all galaxy types."
- 2015 – James M. Lattimer: "For outstanding theoretical work connecting observations of supernovae and neutron stars with neutrino emission and the equation of state of matter beyond nuclear density."
- 2014 – Karl Ludwig Kratz: "For his ground breaking and visionary work towards developing a cohesive picture of the r-process by employing novel experimental techniques to study the decay of nuclei far from stability, working with observations of astronomers, models of astrophysicists and nuclear theorists, and the geochemical analyses of meteorites."
- 2013 – George M. Fuller: "For outstanding contributions to nuclear astrophysics, especially his seminal work on weak interaction rates for stellar evolution and collapse and his pioneering research on neutrino flavor-mixing in supernovae."
- 2012 – Manuel Peimbert & Silvia Torres-Peimbert: "For outstanding work on the primordial helium abundance as well as abundances of other elements and their implications for cosmology and for the chemical evolution of galaxies and stars. This work is fundamental as a critical test for cosmological theories and the baryonic content of the Universe."
- 2011 – Christopher J. Pethick: "For fundamental contributions to the understanding of nuclear matter at very high densities, the structure of neutron stars, their cooling, and the related neutrino processes and astrophysical phenomena."
- 2010 – Claus Rolfs: "For seminal contributions to the experimental determination of nuclear cross-sections in stars, including the first direct measurement of the key 3He fusion reaction at solar conditions"
- 2009 – William David Arnett: "For his outstanding and fundamental work on how nuclear reactions shape multi-dimensional and partly out-of-equilibrium evolution of stars and supernova explosions and their yields of new isotopes."
- 2008 – Friedrich K. Thielemann: "For his many outstanding theoretical contributions to the understanding of nucleosynthesis, stellar evolution and stellar explosions through applications to individual objects and to cosmic chemical evolution."
- 2007 – James R. Wilson: "For his work in nuclear astrophysics and numerical work on supernovae core collapse, neutrino transport, and shock propagation. His codes reenergized supernovae shocks, launched numerical relativity and magnetically driven jets."
- 2006 – Alastair G.W. Cameron: "For his pioneering work in developing the fundamental concepts of nuclear astrophysics. These basic ideas, laid out almost 50 years ago, are still the basis of current research in this field."
- 2005 – Stan Woosley: "For his significant and wide ranging contributions in the areas of stellar evolution, element synthesis, the theory of core collapse and type Ia supernovae, and the interpretation of gamma-ray bursts – most notably, the collapsar model of gamma-ray bursts."
- 2004 – Wick Haxton: "For his noteworthy contributions and scientific leadership in the field of neutrino astrophysics, in particular for his success in merging nuclear theory with experiments and observations in nuclear physics and astrophysics."
- 2003 – Michael C. F. Wiescher: "For his contributions to the experimental foundation of nuclear astrophysics, especially the delineation of the processes involved in explosive hydrogen burning in novae and x-ray bursters; and for providing an intellectual bridge between experimental nuclear astrophysicists and their theoretical col-leagues."
- 2002 – Gordon Baym: "For his superb synthesis of fundamental concepts which have provided an understanding of matter at extreme conditions, ranging from crusts and interiors of neutron stars to matter at ultrahigh temperature."
- 2001 – Gerald E. Brown: "For his insightful analyses of the effects of various nuclear constituents on nucleon interactions and nucleon structure, and his contributions to new viewpoints on supernovae, neutron stars, and black hole formation."
- 2000 – Igal Talmi: "For pioneering work on the shell model of the nucleus that laid the foundation of much of what we know about nuclear structure."
- 1999 – Edwin Ernest Salpeter: "For wide-ranging contributions to nuclear and atomic physics and astrophysics, including the triple-alpha reaction, electron screening of nuclear reactions, charged-current emission of neutrinos, and the form of the stellar initial mass function."
- 1998 – John Norris Bahcall: "For his fundamental work on all theoretical aspects of the solar neutrino problem and his important contributions to other areas of nuclear astrophysics."

== See also ==
- List of physics awards
