= Lead author =

First named author of a publication

In academic publishing, the lead author or first author is the first named author of a publication such as a research article or audit.

Academic authorship standards vary widely across disciplines. In many academic subjects, including the natural sciences, computer science and electrical engineering, the lead author of a research article is typically the person who carried out the research and wrote and edited the paper. The list of trailing co-authors reflects, typically, diminishing contributions to the work reported in the manuscript. Sometimes, journals require statements detailing each author's contributions to be included in each publication. In other disciplines (such as mathematics) however, authors are typically listed alphabetically rather than by contribution.

The proportion of multi-author papers has increased in recent decades, reflecting increasingly complex multi-investigator research projects, as well as the "publish or perish" culture of academic performance evaluation.

== See also ==
- Academic authorship
