= Stanford E. Woosley =

Stanford Earl Woosley (born December 8, 1944) is a physicist, and Professor of Astronomy and Astrophysics. He is the director of the Center for Supernova Research at University of California, Santa Cruz. He has published over 300 papers.

== Research interest ==
Stan Woosley's research centers on theoretical high-energy astrophysics, especially violent explosive events such as supernovae and gamma ray bursts.

A supernova occurs when the core of a star collapses under the gravitational force of its own mass. The resulting explosion can be as bright as an entire galaxy, releasing immense amounts of energy. The explosion also spews into space all of the chemical elements forged by nuclear fusion reactions during the life of a star and some that are formed during the explosion itself. These materials may then contribute to the formation of new stars and planets. Woosley's research projects include simulating the evolution of stars 8 to 50 times the mass of the sun, in an attempt to explain how elements like oxygen and iron are formed.

According to Woosley's collapsar model, gamma-ray bursts arise from the collapse of stars that are too massive to successfully explode as supernovae. Instead, they result in a hypernova, which produce black holes.

Woosley is also co-investigator on the High Energy Transient Explorer-2, a satellite dedicated to the study of gamma-ray bursts, launched by NASA in 2000, and is involved in planning NASA's other missions for gamma-ray astronomy.

== Awards ==
- 1987 - Elected Fellow of the American Physical Society
- 2005 - Bruno Rossi Prize
- 2005 - Hans Bethe Prize
- 2020 - Elected a Legacy Fellow of the American Astronomical Society
- 2026 - Shaw Prize
