= Molière radius =

The Molière radius is a characteristic constant of a material giving the scale of the transverse dimension of the fully contained electromagnetic showers initiated by an incident high energy electron or photon. By definition, it is the radius of a cylinder containing on average 90% of the shower's energy deposition. Two Molière radii contain 95% of the shower's energy deposition. It is related to the radiation length X_{0} by the approximate relation R_{M} = 0.0265 X_{0} (Z + 1.2), where Z is the atomic number. The Molière radius is useful in experimental particle physics in the design of calorimeters: a smaller Molière radius means better shower position resolution, and better shower separation due to a smaller degree of shower overlaps.

The Molière radius is named after German physicist Paul Friederich Gaspard Gert Molière (1909–64).

== Molière radii for typical materials used in calorimetry ==
- LYSO crystals: 2.07 cm
- Lead tungstate crystals: 2.2 cm
- Caesium iodide: 3.5 cm
- Liquid krypton: 4.7 cm
- Liquid argon: 9.04 cm
- Earth's atmosphere at sea level: 79 m
- Earth's atmosphere above ground: 91 m
