= Gert Molière =

German theoretical physicist

Paul Friederich Gaspard Gert Molière (7 April 1909, Butzbach, Hessen – 1964, Tübingen) was a German theoretical physicist, specializing in nuclear physics and particle physics. He is known for the Molière radius, which is useful in studying Bhabha scattering.

== Education and career ==
Gert Molière received in 1935 from the Humboldt University of Berlin his doctorate (Promotion) under the supervision of Max von Laue. In the same year Molière became a research assistant (and first theoretical physicist) at the Kaiser Wilhelm Institute (KWI) for physical chemistry and electrochemistry in Berlin-Dahlem (today's Fritz Haber Institute). At the institute he developed a quantum mechanical approach to X-ray scattering in extension of Laue's classical dynamic theory of diffraction. (At KWI, his younger brother Kurt Molière (1912–1994) completed his doctoral dissertation in 1939 on a related subject and after World War II headed a department.) After 1940, Gert Molière moved to the KWI for Physics, which was relocated to Hechingen in 1943 because of Allied bombing. Here he wrote his habilitation thesis (associated with the University of Tübingen) in 1947 on multiple scattering at high energies. Until the end of 1949, Molière was at the KWI in Hechingen. After institutional restructuring, in 1950 he was assigned to the research center for spectroscopy of the Max Planck Society under the direction of Hermann Schüler (1894–1964). In the winter of 1951–1952, Molière worked at the invitation of Werner Heisenberg at the KWI's successor institute, the Max Planck Institute for Physics in Göttingen. In 1952, mediated by César Lattes, he went to Rio de Janeiro (at Centro Brasileiro de Pesquisas Físicas) and in 1954 to São Paulo, where he was director of São Paulo State University's Instituto de Física Teórica (IFT) in 1955/56. He then briefly held the professorial chair vacated in 1955 by David Bohm before returning to Europe in July 1957. From 1957 to 1959 he worked as a research assistant at CERN in Geneva. In addition, he had been a lecturer since 1948 and an adjunct professor since 1954 at the Eberhard-Karls-Universität Tübingen (on leave 1951–1959), where he was appointed to a Diätendozentur (docent lectureship) in 1959 and was finally appointed Wissenschaftlicher Rat (scientist employed by the German civil service) in 1964.

At the KWI for Physics, Molière devoted himself (at the suggestion of Werner Heisenberg) to researching cosmic radiation and the associated high-altitude showers. The concept of the Molière radius, which is a measure of the transverse extent of a particle shower, is based on his results. His best-known publications date from the period immediately after the war and deal with the problem of quantum mechanical individual and multiple scattering. Molière's high-energy approximation for single scattering was interpreted by Roy J. Glauber as semiclassical approximation and is also known under the name eikonal approximation. Hans Bethe confirmed Molière's results on multiple scattering shortly after their publication.

Molière's extensive correspondence with Heisenberg shows that he was dissatisfied with his permanent position in Brazil and therefore decided on a temporary position at CERN. He also mentions his illness from ankylosing spondylitis. Many of his letters describe his financial difficulties: In Europe, Molière was mainly employed only under temporary contracts. In 1950, for example, when he switched from the KWI to the research center for spectroscopy, he was immediately under threat of non-renewal of his contract. From October 1951, at Heisenberg's request, the Max Planck Society financed Molière's research by repeatedly renewing temporary contracts.

One of his doctoral students in Tübingen was Hans Joos.
