= Particle shower =

Extra particles from a particle impact

In particle physics, a shower is a cascade of secondary particles produced as the result of a high-energy particle interacting with dense matter. The incoming particle interacts, producing multiple new particles with lesser energy; each of these then interacts, in the same way, a process that continues until many thousands, millions, or even billions of low-energy particles are produced. These are then stopped in the matter and absorbed.

== Types ==
The start of an electromagnetic shower.

There are two basic types of showers. Electromagnetic showers are produced by a particle that interacts primarily or exclusively via the electromagnetic force, usually a photon or electron. Hadronic showers are produced by hadrons (i.e. nucleons and other particles made of quarks), and proceed mostly via the strong nuclear force.

=== Electromagnetic showers ===
An electromagnetic shower begins when a high-energy electron, positron or photon enters a material. At high energies (above a few MeV), in which the photoelectric effect and Compton scattering are insignificant, photons interact with matter primarily via pair production — that is, they convert into an electron-positron pair, interacting with an atomic nucleus or electron in order to conserve momentum. High-energy electrons and positrons primarily emit photons, a process called bremsstrahlung. These two processes (pair production and bremsstrahlung) continue, leading to a cascade of particles of decreasing energy until photons fall below the pair production threshold, and energy losses of electrons other than bremsstrahlung start to dominate. The characteristic amount of matter traversed for these related interactions is called the radiation length $X_0$. $X_0$ is both the mean distance over which a high-energy electron loses all but 1/e of its energy by bremsstrahlung and 7/9 of the mean free path for pair production by a high energy photon. The length of the cascade scales with $X_0$; the "shower depth" is approximately determined by the relation

$$X = X_0 \frac{\ln(E_0/E_\mathrm{c})}{\ln2},$$

where $X_0$ is the radiation length of the matter, and $E_\mathrm{c}$ is the critical energy (the critical energy can be defined as the energy in which the bremsstrahlung and ionization rates are equal. A rough estimate is $E_\mathrm{c} = 800\,\mathrm{MeV}/(Z+1.2)$). The shower depth increases logarithmically with the energy, while the lateral spread of the shower is mainly due to the multiple scattering of the electrons. Up to the shower maximum the shower is contained in a cylinder with radius < 1 radiation length. Beyond that point electrons are increasingly affected by multiple scattering, and the lateral size scales with the Molière radius $R_\mathrm{M}$. The propagation of the photons in the shower causes deviations from Molière radius scaling. However, roughly 95% of the shower are contained laterally in a cylinder with radius $2R_\mathrm{M}$.

The mean longitudinal profile of the energy deposition in electromagnetic cascades is reasonably well described by a gamma distribution:

$$\frac{dE}{dt} = E_0b  \frac{(bt)^{a-1}e^{-bt}}{\Gamma(a)}$$

where $t=X/X_{0}$, $E_0$ is the initial energy and $a$ and $b$ are parameters to be fitted with Monte Carlo or experimental data.

=== Hadronic showers ===
The physical processes that cause the propagation of a hadron shower are considerably different from the processes in electromagnetic showers. About half of the incident hadron energy is passed on to additional secondaries. The remainder is consumed in multiparticle production of slow pions and in other processes. The phenomena which determine the development of the hadronic showers are: hadron production, nuclear deexcitation and pion and muon decays. Neutral pions amount, on average to 1/3 of the produced pions and their energy is dissipated in the form of electromagnetic showers. Another important characteristic of the hadronic shower is that it takes longer to develop than the electromagnetic one. This can be seen by comparing the number of particles present versus depth for pion and electron initiated showers. The longitudinal development of hadronic showers scales with the nuclear interaction length:

$$\lambda=\frac{A}{N_A \sigma_\mathrm{abs}}$$

The lateral shower development does not scale with λ.

== Theoretical analysis ==
A simple model for the cascade theory of electronic showers can be formulated as a set of integro-partial differential equations. Let Π (E,x) dE and Γ(E,x) dE be the number of particles and photons with energy between E and E+dE respectively (here x is the distance along the material). Similarly let γ(E,E')dE' be the probability per unit path length for a photon of energy E to produce an electron with energy between E' and E'+dE'. Finally let π(E,E')dE' be the probability per unit path length for an electron of energy E to emit a photon with energy between E' and E'+dE'. The set of integro-differential equations which govern Π and Γ are given by

$$\begin{align}
\frac{d \Pi(E,x)}{dx} &= 2 \int_{E}^{\infty} \Gamma(u,x) \gamma(u,E) du + \int_E^{\infty} \Pi(u,x) \pi(u,u-E) du - \int_0^{E} \Pi(E,x) \pi(E,E-u) du \\
\frac{d \Gamma(E,x)}{dx} &= \int_E^{\infty} \Pi(u,x) \pi(u,E)du - \int_0^E \Gamma(E,x) \gamma(E,u)du.
\end{align}$$

γ and π are found in for low energies and in for higher energies.

== Examples ==
Cosmic rays hit Earth's atmosphere on a regular basis, and they produce showers as they proceed through the atmosphere. It was from these air showers that the first muons and pions were detected experimentally, and they are used today by a number of experiments as a means of observing ultra-high-energy cosmic rays. Some experiments, like Fly's Eye, have observed the visible atmospheric fluorescence produced at the peak intensity of the shower; others, like Haverah Park experiment, have detected the remains of a shower by sampling the energy deposited over a large area on the ground.

In particle detectors built at high-energy particle accelerators, a device called a calorimeter records the energy of particles by causing them to produce a shower and then measuring the energy deposited as a result. Many large modern detectors have both an electromagnetic calorimeter and a hadronic calorimeter, with each designed specially to produce that particular kind of shower and measure the energy of the associated type of particle.

== See also ==
- Air shower (physics), an extensive (many kilometres wide) cascade of ionized particles and electromagnetic radiation produced in the atmosphere when a primary cosmic ray (i.e. one of extraterrestrial origin) enters our atmosphere.
- Telescope Array Project
- MAGIC Cherenkov Telescope
- High Altitude Water Cherenkov Experiment
- Pierre Auger Observatory
- ATLAS experiment calorimeters
- CMS experiment, electromagnetic and hadronic calorimeters
- Collision cascade, a set of collisions between atoms in a solid
