= Eikonal =

Eikonal is the German form of the Greek word εἰκών, meaning likeness, icon or image. It can refer to:

- Eikonal equation, a non-linear partial differential equation encountered in problems of wave propagation.
- Eikonal approximation, a method of approximation useful in wave scattering equations.
- Operation Eikonal, an operation conducted by the National Security Agency in collaboration with the Bundesnachrichtendienst.
