= Glauber multiple scattering theory =

Phenomenon in high-energy physics

The Glauber multiple scattering theory is a framework developed by Roy J. Glauber to describe the scattering of particles off composite targets, such as nuclei, in terms of multiple interactions between the probing particle and the individual constituents of the target. It is widely used in high-energy physics, nuclear physics, and hadronic physics, where quantum coherence effects and multiple scatterings are significant.

== Description ==
The basic idea of the Glauber formalism is that the incident projectile is assumed to interact with each component of the complex target in turn as it moves in a straight line through the target. This assumes the eikonal approximation, viz that the projectile's trajectory is nearly straight-line, with only small-angle deflections due to interactions with the target component. The theory accounts for the fact that a projectile may interact with more than one constituent (e.g., the nucleons of a target nucleus) as it passes through the target nucleus. These interactions are treated coherently. The scattering amplitude is taken as the sum over contributions from multiple scatterings. This is done using the optical model, where the target nucleus is treated as a complex potential. In fact, coherent superposition of scattering amplitudes from all possible paths through the nucleus is a fundamental aspect, leading to phenomena like diffraction patterns. The theory often uses Gaussian or Woods–Saxon potential distributions for nuclear densities.

== Formalism ==
The elastic scattering amplitude $F(q)$ in Glauber theory is given by:

$$F(q)=\frac{ik}{2\pi} \int d^2b e^{i \vec{q}\vec{b}(1-e^{i\chi(\vec{b})})} ,$$

where: $\vec{q}$ is the momentum transfer, $\vec{b}$ is the impact parameter, $\chi(\vec{b})$ is the eikonal phase shift representing the integrated interaction potential.

For a nucleus, $\chi(\vec{b})$ is expressed as the sum of contributions from individual nucleons, $\textstyle \chi(\vec{b}) = \sum_j \chi_j (\vec{b} - \vec{s}_j)$ where $\vec{s}_j$ is the transverse position of nucleon $j$.

At high energies, the above formalism simplifies by focusing on transverse geometry and neglecting effects like spin or low-energy dynamics. Relativistic corrections were not part of the original formalism, but have been included in modern applications when they are necessary (high-energy cases). Other simplifications are that the theory assumes independent scatterings, neglects correlations between nucleons and, as an effective modeling, does not account for some QCD effects directly, which are significant at very small distances.

== Applications ==
The Glauber theory has been applied to:

- Elastic and inelastic scattering of protons, neutrons, and other particles off nuclei.
- Heavy-ion collisions to describe the initial geometry of collisions and energy deposition.
- High-energy diffraction in hadron–hadron or hadron–nucleus scattering.
- EMC effect, specifically nuclear shadowing, in deep inelastic scattering.
- Color transparency which describes how much of the projectile penetrates the target nucleus without being absorbed or deflected significantly.

== See also ==
- Roy J. Glauber
- Coherent state
