= Stolzite =

Mineral - Lead Tungstate ( PbWO4)

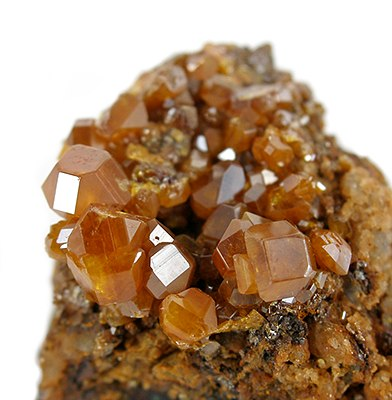
- Stolzite, Broken Hill, Australia (size: 3.6 x 3.0 x 2.6 cm)

General
- Category: Tungstate minerals
- Formula: PbWO_{4}
- IMA symbol: Sz
- Strunz classification: 7.GA.05
- Crystal system: Tetragonal
- Crystal class: Dipyramidal (4/m); H-M symbol: (4/m)
- Space group: I4_{1}/a
- Unit cell: a = 5.461, c = 12.049 [Å]; Z = 4

Identification
- Color: Reddish brown, brown, yellowish gray, smoky gray, straw-yellow, lemon-yellow; may be green, orange, red
- Crystal habit: Crystals dipyramidal to tabular
- Cleavage: Imperfect on {001}, indistinct on {011}
- Fracture: Conchoidal to uneven
- Tenacity: Brittle
- Mohs scale hardness: 2.5–3
- Luster: Resinous, subadamantine
- Streak: White
- Diaphaneity: Translucent to transparent
- Specific gravity: 8.34
- Optical properties: Uniaxial (−)
- Refractive index: n_{ω} = 2.270 n_{ε} = 2.180 – 2.190
- Birefringence: δ = 0.090

Stolzite is a mineral, a lead tungstate; with the formula PbWO_{4}. It is similar to, and often associated with, wulfenite which is the same chemical formula except that the tungsten is replaced by molybdenum. Stolzite crystallizes in the tetragonal crystal system and is dimorphous with the monoclinic form raspite.

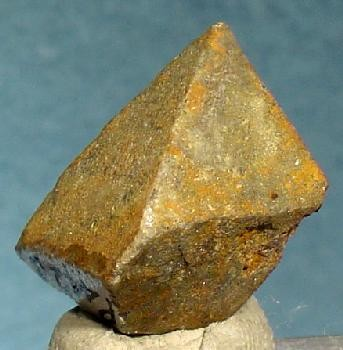
Stolzite crystal from the Darwin District, Inyo County, California (size: 2.0 × 1.7 × 1.6 cm)

Lead tungstate crystals have the optical transparency of glass combined with much higher density (8.28 g/cm^{3} vs ~2.2 g/cm^{3} for fused silica). They are used as scintillators in particle physics because of their short radiation length (0.89 cm), low Molière radius (2.2 cm), quick scintillation response, and radiation hardness. Lead tungstate crystals are used in the Compact Muon Solenoid's electromagnetic calorimeter.

It was first described in 1820 by August Breithaupt, who called it Scheelbleispath and then by François Sulpice Beudant in 1832, who called it scheelitine. In 1845, Wilhelm Karl Ritter von Haidinger coined the name stolzite for an occurrence in the Ore Mountains, Bohemia (today the Czech Republic), naming it after Joseph Alexi Stolz of Teplice in Bohemia. It occurs in oxidized hydrothermal tungsten-lead ore deposits typically in association with raspite, cerussite, anglesite, pyromorphite and mimetite.

== See also ==
- List of minerals
- List of minerals named after people
