= William Taussig Scott =

American physicist and philosopher of science (1916–1999)

- Born: March 16, 1916; Yonkers, New York, U.S.
- Died: February 22, 1999 (aged 82); Santa Rosa, California, U.S.
- Education: Swarthmore College (BA, 1937); University of Michigan (PhD, 1941)
- Known for: Theory of multiple scattering of fast charged particles Analytic solutions for cloud droplet coalescence Biography of Michael Polanyi
- Awards: Fellow of the American Physical Society (1957); Thornton Peace Prize (1972; 1991, with Ann Herbert Scott)
- Scientific career
- Fields: Theoretical physics, atmospheric physics, philosophy of science
- Workplaces: Amherst College; Deep Springs College; Smith College; Brookhaven National Laboratory; Harvard University; University of Nevada, Reno; Desert Research Institute
- Thesis: On the Mathematical Theory of Cosmic Ray Showers (1941)
- Doctoral advisor: George Uhlenbeck

William Taussig Scott (March 16, 1916 – February 22, 1999) was an American theoretical physicist and philosopher of science whose work ranged across particle physics, atmospheric physics, the history of physics, the philosophy of science, and the relationship between science and religion. He was a Fellow of the American Physical Society. With Hartland Snyder he developed a theory of the multiple scattering of fast charged particles, and his later work in atmospheric physics produced analytic solutions for the coalescence of cloud droplets. He taught physics at Smith College and the University of Nevada, Reno, and wrote a textbook on electricity and magnetism, a study of Erwin Schrödinger's writings, and a 293,000-word biography of the scientist and philosopher Michael Polanyi, which Martin X. Moleski abridged and saw through to posthumous publication in 2005. A Quaker and a conscientious objector during World War II, he was a co-founder of the Society for Social Responsibility in Science and its president from 1955 to 1957.

== Early life and education ==
Scott was born in Yonkers, New York, on March 16, 1916. He attended the Scarborough School and began college at Haverford College before transferring to Swarthmore College. He graduated from Swarthmore in 1937 with highest honors in mathematics and the natural sciences, was elected to Phi Beta Kappa, and received the college's John Lockwood Memorial Fellowship. He joined the Religious Society of Friends while a student at Swarthmore. At the University of Michigan he was one of ten graduate students awarded a Rackham predoctoral fellowship in 1939. He received a PhD in physics from Michigan on June 21, 1941, with a dissertation titled "On the Mathematical Theory of Cosmic Ray Showers". (Note: The 1941 commencement program gives this title; the dissertation as printed in 1942 is titled On the Theory of Cosmic-Ray Showers.) He was a doctoral student of George Uhlenbeck, and his paper with Uhlenbeck in Physical Review in 1942 was issued as his doctoral dissertation.

== Career ==
=== Amherst and Deep Springs (1941–1945) ===
Scott was a conscientious objector during World War II. After completing his doctorate he taught physics at Amherst College until 1944, and then for a year at Deep Springs Junior College (now Deep Springs College) in California.

=== Smith College (1945–1961) ===
Scott taught at Smith College from 1945 to 1961. He spent his summers from 1947 to 1953 at Brookhaven National Laboratory, and the 1952–53 academic year there on sabbatical leave, but in 1950 declined to accept a permanent position there. At Brookhaven he compiled and edited the laboratory's report on its 1947 cosmic-ray conference and contributed a paper on multiple scattering to it; he also worked there with Samuel Goudsmit on time-of-flight mass spectrometry. From 1954 to 1956 he spent his summers at the National Bureau of Standards; in 1957 he taught in the physics and applied physics departments of Harvard's summer school, and he helped produce the Physical Science Study Committee's films for school physics courses. He was elected a Fellow of the American Physical Society in 1957. He became chairman of the physics department, and was promoted to full professor in 1959.

In 1959–60 he held a National Science Faculty Fellowship at Yale University, where he worked with Henry Margenau on the theory of measurement in quantum mechanics and studied theology with Robert Calhoun and other faculty of the Yale Divinity School.

=== University of Nevada, Reno (1961–1981) ===
In 1961, after Samuel Goudsmit had urged him to take a permanent position there, Scott joined the University of Nevada, Reno, as professor of physics, to set up a graduate program in physics; he was granted tenure effective July 1, 1963, and taught physics and philosophy of science there until 1981, when he retired as professor emeritus of physics. From 1965 to 1975 he also conducted research in cloud physics at the Desert Research Institute. In 1967 he became the founding chairman of the university's Committee on the Philosophy of Inquiry, which drew members from fourteen departments; he directed it for a decade, and it sponsored twenty interdisciplinary courses with support from the National Endowment for the Humanities. His courses included "Science and Religion" and "Philosophy and Methods of Physical Science". In 1969–70 he spent a sabbatical year in Oxford on a National Science Foundation grant, working with Polanyi and the philosopher Rom Harré. He took part in developing the university's graduate and honors programs. He served as an associate editor of the American Journal of Physics in 1965–1971 and 1977–1980. In the 1970s he worked to bring Goudsmit to the university, where, after retiring from the American Physical Society and Brookhaven, Goudsmit became a distinguished visiting professor of physics.

== Research ==
=== Cosmic-ray showers ===
After his dissertation he continued to publish on the theory of cosmic-ray showers, including papers on a difference-equation method (1950) and on fluctuations in electron cascades (1951).

=== Multiple scattering ===
With Samuel Goudsmit, Scott proposed a method for measuring the scattering of particle tracks in 1948.

With Hartland Snyder, Scott published a theory of the multiple scattering of fast charged particles in Physical Review in 1949, first presented at the American Physical Society's meeting in New York that January; in his contribution to Brookhaven's September 1947 cosmic-ray conference, Scott had reported a solution of the scattering integral equation for a screened Coulomb potential, with numerical calculations begun. Gert Molière, working in Germany, published a theory of the same problem in 1947–48; in 1952 Scott compared the two and stated that they rested on the same mathematical development. In his 1952 textbook High-Energy Particles, Bruno Rossi described the problem as "undertaken by Moliere and (with a different method) by Snyder and Scott". In his own 1953 reformulation, Hans Bethe grouped the Snyder–Scott and Molière treatments among closely related theories of multiple scattering and wrote that his own formula for large angles agreed "essentially with that of Molière, Snyder, and Scott". Scott's 1963 review of the field, "The Theory of Small-Angle Multiple Scattering of Fast Charged Particles" in Reviews of Modern Physics, framed its treatment around what it called the Snyder–Scott–Molière theory.

=== Quantum measurement ===
Scott published a two-part study, "The consequences of measurement in quantum mechanics", in the Annals of Physics in 1968. The first part analyzed an idealized determination of a particle's trajectory; the second, written with Dick H. Holze, worked through a detailed thought experiment of a position measurement.

=== Cloud physics ===
At Nevada, Scott turned to cloud physics, which he also used as a case study in "The Gentle Rain: A Search for Understanding", his contribution to the 1968 essay collection Intellect and Hope: Essays in the Thought of Michael Polanyi. His 1968 paper "Analytic Studies of Cloud Droplet Coalescence" in the Journal of the Atmospheric Sciences gave exact solutions of the stochastic collection equation for its three solvable cases, which are still used as reference cases for testing numerical cloud models.

== Philosophy and the Polanyi biography ==
Scott first met Michael Polanyi at Yale in November 1959. After writing a review of Polanyi's Personal Knowledge, he began a correspondence with Polanyi that became a friendship lasting until Polanyi's death. He also wrote on science and religion for Quaker and church readers, including "Modern Thought and Quaker Beliefs" in Friends Journal (1955) and "A Course in Science and Religion Following the Ideas of Michael Polanyi" in The Christian Scholar (1964). In 1965 he chaired a session of the Bowdoin Study Group on Foundations of Cultural Unity, whose proceedings Marjorie Grene edited as Toward a Unity of Knowledge (1969). Scott published on Polanyi's thought in journals including The Massachusetts Review (1962), Zygon (1970), The Philosophical Quarterly (1971), Mind (1972) and, in two parts, Archives de Philosophie (1972).

== Books ==
=== The Physics of Electricity and Magnetism (1959) ===
Scott's textbook The Physics of Electricity and Magnetism (John Wiley & Sons, 1959; second edition 1966) took a historical approach to the subject. He credited the late David C. Grahame of Amherst College with suggesting its use of the cavity-potential concept, and dedicated it in part to George Uhlenbeck, "who taught me what physics is". Reviewing the first edition in Physics Today, Jacques Romain noted that it included "many topics not currently found in introductory textbooks". In the American Journal of Physics, Hugh C. Wolfe called it "a fine text" for well-prepared students; both editions were reviewed in that journal. The journal also published his "Resource Letter on the Evolution of the Electromagnetic Field Concept" (1963) and, later, his comparative review of eleven electricity and magnetism textbooks (1976).

=== Erwin Schrödinger: An Introduction to His Writings (1967) ===
Scott's Erwin Schrödinger: An Introduction to His Writings (University of Massachusetts Press, 1967), prepared with support from a 1962 National Science Foundation grant, surveyed Schrödinger's work in theoretical physics and philosophy. Reviewing it in Physics Today, Nandor Balazs called it "a lovely book". It was also reviewed in Science by Martin J. Klein and in Isis by John L. Heilbron. A later reference guide described it as "the most complete source of information on Schrödinger and his work".

=== Michael Polanyi: Scientist and Philosopher (2005) ===
Polanyi's widow, Magda Polanyi, asked Scott in 1977 to write her husband's biography, citing the value of a biographer trained in both science and philosophy. The project occupied most of the last two decades of his life, with support from the National Endowment for the Humanities, the American Philosophical Society and the Max Planck Society. Scott interviewed more than 150 people who had known Polanyi, corresponded with some 150 others, and worked through Polanyi's roughly 200 scientific papers. His draft ran to 293,000 words in 25 chapters; a revised draft was completed in 1994. Scott had Parkinson's disease, which was not diagnosed until the mid-1990s, and under a 1997 agreement the Polanyi scholar Martin X. Moleski joined the project as co-author to bring it to publication. Moleski abridged and reorganized the manuscript, and after Scott's death Oxford University Press published it in 2005, in 364 pages, as Michael Polanyi: Scientist and Philosopher, with Scott as first author. The book was reviewed in the British Journal for the History of Science, in Chemistry World, which called it "a coherent, congenial, yet comprehensive and compelling, story", and in a review symposium in Tradition and Discovery, where John Puddefoot regretted that the abridgment had removed most of Scott's detailed analysis of Polanyi's philosophy while calling the result "no small achievement".

== Science, ethics and social responsibility ==
Scott's decision not to work on weapons research shaped his scientific career. He was a co-founder in 1949 of the Society for Social Responsibility in Science, an organization whose members included Albert Einstein, and was its president from 1955 to 1957. He also wrote on arms control as a scientist, including a 1959 letter to The New York Times on preventing surprise attack and a 1971 letter to Scientific American during the SALT negotiations.

In Reno he was a co-founder of the Reno Friends Meeting, the first Quaker meeting in Nevada, and of the West Coast Quaker Association on Religion and Psychology, and he helped found the Northern Nevada Peace Center and Sierra Interfaith Action for Peace. He twice received the University of Nevada's Thornton Peace Prize, in 1972 and, with Ann Herbert Scott, in 1991. (Note: The University of Nevada, Reno, list of Thornton Peace Prize recipients gives 1991; the university's archival guide to the Scott papers gives 1990.)

== Death and legacy ==
Scott died of Parkinson's disease on February 22, 1999, at Friends House in Santa Rosa, California. His papers are held in the Special Collections of the University of Nevada, Reno, and his collection on Michael Polanyi is listed in the American Institute of Physics International Catalog of Sources. In 2007 the Polanyi Society reported a William T. Scott Memorial Fund to assist young scholars.

== Selected works ==
- The Physics of Electricity and Magnetism (John Wiley & Sons, 1959)
- Erwin Schrödinger: An Introduction to His Writings (University of Massachusetts Press, 1967)
- Michael Polanyi: Scientist and Philosopher, with Martin X. Moleski (Oxford University Press, 2005)
