= Nuclear collision length =

Nuclear collision length is the mean free path of a particle before undergoing elastic scattering or a nuclear reaction, for a given particle in a given medium. The collision length is smaller than the nuclear interaction length because the latter excludes the elastic and quasi-elastic (diffractive) reactions from its definition.

== See also ==
- Nuclear interaction length
- Radiation length
