= Raspite =

Lead tungstate mineral

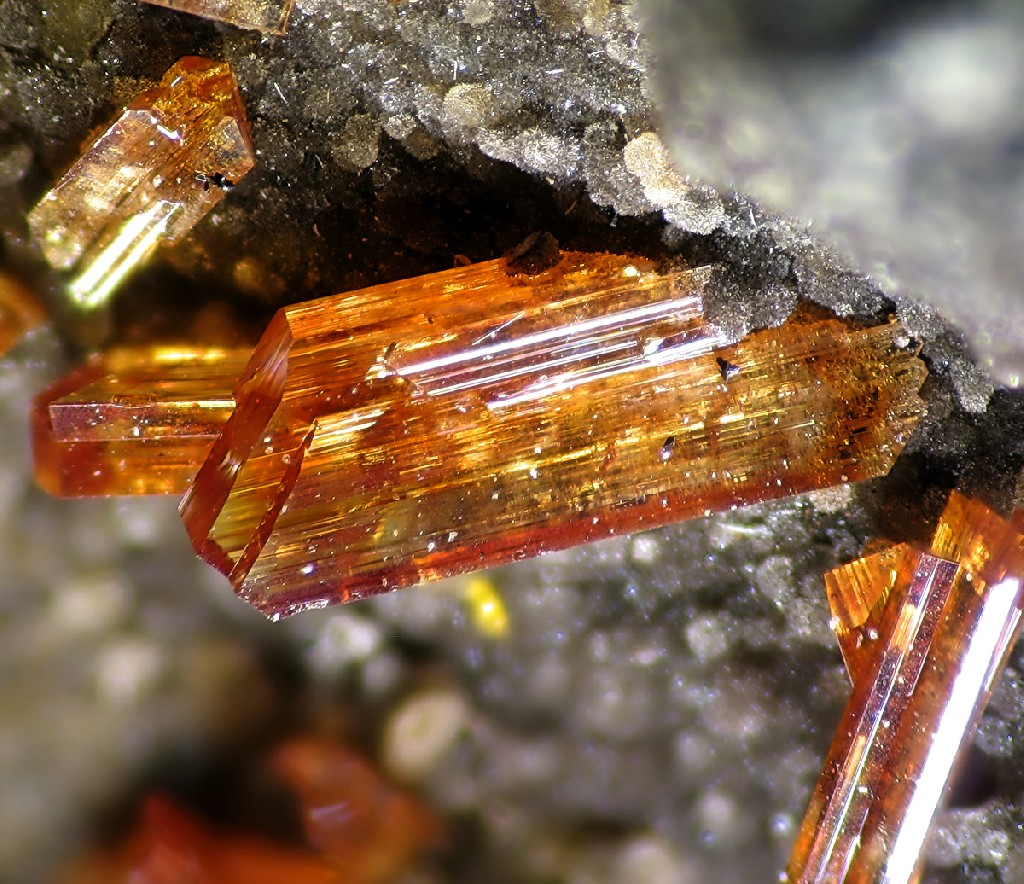

General
- Category: Oxide minerals
- Formula: PbWO_{4}
- IMA symbol: Rsp
- Strunz classification: 4.DG.20
- Crystal system: Monoclinic
- Crystal class: Prismatic (2/m) (same H-M symbol)
- Space group: P2_{1}/b

Identification
- Colour: Light yellow, yellowish brown, grey
- Crystal habit: Tabular (may have striations), elongate
- Cleavage: Perfect {100}
- Mohs scale hardness: 2.5–3
- Luster: Adamantine
- Solubility: Decomposes in HCl

Raspite is a mineral, a lead tungstate; with the formula PbWO_{4}. It forms yellow to yellowish brown monoclinic crystals. It is the low temperature monoclinic dimorph of the tetragonal stolzite.

It was discovered in 1897 at Broken Hill, New South Wales, Australia, it was named for Charles Rasp (1846–1907), German-Australian prospector, discoverer of the Broken Hill ore deposit.

== See also ==
- List of minerals
- List of minerals named after people

== Bibliography ==
- Palache, P.; Berman H.; Frondel, C. (1960). "Dana's System of Mineralogy, Volume II: Halides, Nitrates, Borates, Carbonates, Sulfates, Phosphates, Arsenates, Tungstates, Molybdates, Etc. (Seventh Edition)" John Wiley and Sons, Inc., New York, pp. 1089–1090.
