= Calorimeter (particle physics) =

Experimental apparatus that measures the energy of particles

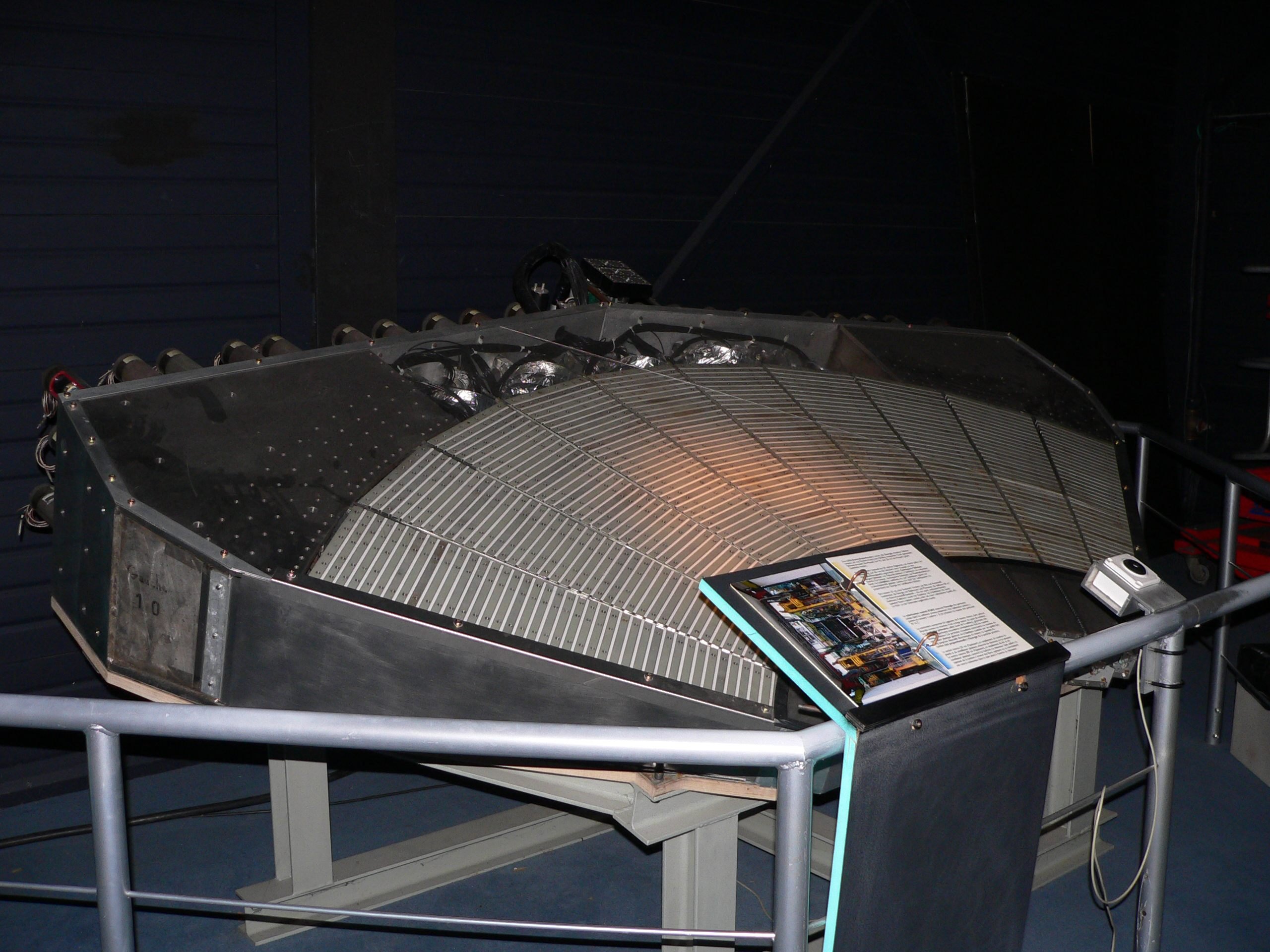
a Calorimeter in CERN.

In experimental particle physics, a calorimeter is a type of detector that measures the energy of particles. Particles enter the calorimeter and initiate a particle shower in which their energy is deposited in the calorimeter, collected, and measured. The energy may be measured in its entirety, requiring total containment of the particle shower, or it may be sampled. Typically, calorimeters are segmented transversely to provide information about the direction of the particle or particles, as well as the energy deposited, and longitudinal segmentation can provide information about the identity of the particle based on the shape of the shower as it develops. Calorimetry design is an active area of research in particle physics.

== Types of calorimeters ==
=== Electromagnetic versus hadronic ===
An electromagnetic calorimeter (ECAL) is one specifically designed to measure the energy of particles that interact primarily via the electromagnetic interaction such as electrons, positrons and photons. A hadronic calorimeter (HCAL) is one designed to measure particles that interact via the strong nuclear force. (See types of particle showers for the differences between the two.) Calorimeters are characterized by the radiation length (for ECALs) and nuclear interaction length (for HCALs) of their active material. ECALs tend to be 15–30 radiation lengths deep while HCALs are 5–8 nuclear interaction lengths deep.

=== Homogeneous versus sampling ===
An ECAL or an HCAL can be either a sampling calorimeter or a homogeneous calorimeter.

In a sampling calorimeter, the material that produces the particle shower is distinct from the material that measures the deposited energy. Typically the two materials alternate. One advantage of this is that each material can be well-suited to its task; for example, a very dense material can be used to produce a shower that evolves quickly in a limited space, even if the material is unsuitable for measuring the energy deposited by the shower. A disadvantage is that some of the energy is deposited in the wrong material and is not measured; thus the total shower energy must be estimated instead of being measured directly.

A homogeneous calorimeter is one in which the entire volume is sensitive and contributes a signal.

== Calorimeters in high-energy physics experiments ==
Most particle physics experiments use some form of calorimetry. Often it is the most practical way to detect and measure neutral particles from an interaction. In addition, calorimeters are necessary for calculating "missing energy" which can be attributed to particles that rarely interact with matter and escape the detector, such as neutrinos. In most experiments the calorimeter works in conjunction with other components like a central tracker and a muon detector. All the detector components work together to achieve the objective of reconstructing a physics event.

== See also ==
- Calorimeter (for other uses of the term)
- Total absorption spectroscopy, a technique whose main measuring device is a calorimeter
