= Narcosis =

Narcosis may refer to:

== In science ==
- Carbon dioxide narcosis, condition where a high level of carbon dioxide in the blood leads to a depressed level of consciousness
- Hydrogen narcosis, an effect of diving deep with hydrogen
- Nitrogen narcosis, an effect of diving deep with nitrogen
- Unconsciousness induced
  - by a narcotic drug
  - through anesthesia

== In music ==
- Narcosis (band), a punk band
- "Narcosis", a song by Tomahawk from the album Tomahawk, 2001

== See also ==
- Narcolepsy, a chronic neurological disorder
- Necrosis, a form of cell injury that results in the premature death of cells
- Sleep
