= Nuclear interaction length =

Nuclear interaction length is the mean distance travelled by a hadronic particle before undergoing an inelastic nuclear interaction.

== See also ==
- Nuclear collision length
- Radiation length
