= Radiation length =

Electron penetration depth at which its energy is reduced by 1/e

In particle physics, the radiation length is a characteristic of a material, related to the energy loss of high energy particles electromagnetically interacting with it. It is defined as the mean length (in cm) into the material at which the energy of an electron is reduced by the factor 1/e.

== Definition ==
In materials of high atomic number (e.g. tungsten, uranium, plutonium) the electrons of energies >~10 MeV predominantly lose energy by bremsstrahlung, and high-energy photons by e^{+}e^{−} pair production. The characteristic amount of matter traversed for these related interactions is called the radiation length X_{0}, usually measured in g·cm^{−2}. It is both the mean distance over which a high-energy electron loses all but 1/e of its energy by bremsstrahlung, and 7/9 of the mean free path for pair production by a high-energy photon. It is also the appropriate length scale for describing high-energy electromagnetic cascades.

The radiation length for a given material consisting of a single type of nucleus can be approximated by the following expression:

$X_0 = 716.4 \text{ g cm}^{-2} \frac{A}{Z (Z+1) \ln{\frac{287}{\sqrt{Z}}}} = 1433 \text{ g cm}^{-2} \frac{A}{Z (Z+1) (11.319 - \ln{Z})},$

where Z is the atomic number and A is mass number of the nucleus.

For Z > 4, a good approximation is. $\frac{1}{X_0} = 4 \left( \frac{\hbar}{m_\mathrm{e} c} \right)^2 Z(Z+1) \alpha^3 n_\mathrm{a} \log\left(\frac{183}{Z^{1/3}}\right),$

where

- n_{a} is the number density of the nucleus,
- $\hbar$ denotes the reduced Planck constant,
- m_{e} is the electron rest mass,
- c is the speed of light,
- α is the fine-structure constant.

For electrons at lower energies (below few tens of MeV), the energy loss by ionization is predominant.

While this definition may also be used for other electromagnetic interacting particles beyond leptons and photons, the presence of the stronger hadronic and nuclear interaction makes it a far less interesting characterisation of the material; the nuclear collision length and nuclear interaction length are more relevant.

Comprehensive tables for radiation lengths and other properties of materials are available from the Particle Data Group.

== See also ==
- Mean free path
- Attenuation length
- Attenuation coefficient
- Attenuation
- Range (particle radiation)
- Stopping power (particle radiation)
- Electron energy loss spectroscopy
