= Eikonal approximation =

Theoretical physics method in wave scattering equations

In theoretical physics, the eikonal approximation (Greek εἰκών for likeness, icon or image) is an approximative method useful in wave scattering equations, which occur in optics, seismology, quantum mechanics, quantum electrodynamics, and partial wave expansion.

== Informal description ==
The main advantage that the eikonal approximation offers is that the equations reduce to a differential equation in a single variable. This reduction into a single variable is the result of the straight line approximation or the eikonal approximation, which allows us to choose the straight line as a special direction.

== Relation to the WKB approximation ==
The early steps involved in the eikonal approximation in quantum mechanics are very closely related to the WKB approximation for one-dimensional waves. The WKB method, like the eikonal approximation, reduces the equations into a differential equation in a single variable. But the difficulty with the WKB approximation is that this variable is described by the trajectory of the particle which, in general, is complicated.

== Formal description ==
Making use of WKB approximation we can write the wave function of the scattered system in terms of action S:

$$\Psi=e^{iS/{\hbar}}$$

Inserting the wavefunction Ψ in the Schrödinger equation without the presence of a magnetic field we obtain

$$-\frac{{\hbar}^2}{2m} {\nabla}^2 \Psi= (E-V) \Psi$$

$$-\frac{{\hbar}^2}{2m} {\nabla}^2 {e^{iS/{\hbar}}}=(E-V) e^{iS/{\hbar}}$$

$$\frac{1}{2m} {(\nabla S)}^2 - \frac{i\hbar}{2m}{\nabla}^2 S= E-V$$

We write S as a power series in ħ

$$S= S_0 + \frac {\hbar}{i} S_1 + ...$$

For the zero-th order:

$$\frac{1}{2m}  {(\nabla S_0)}^2 = E-V$$

If we consider the one-dimensional case then ${\nabla}^2 \rightarrow {\partial_z}^2$.

We obtain a differential equation with the boundary condition:

$$\frac{S(z=z_0)}{\hbar}= k z_0$$

for $V \rightarrow 0$, $z \rightarrow -\infty$.

$$\frac{d}{dz}\frac{S_0}{\hbar}= \sqrt{k^2 - 2mV/{\hbar}^2}$$

$$\frac{S_0(z)}{\hbar}= kz - \frac{m}{{\hbar}^2 k} \int_{-\infty}^{z}{V dz'}$$

== See also ==
- Eikonal equation
- Correspondence principle
- Principle of least action
